This page lists all described genera and species of the spider family Agelenidae. , the World Spider Catalog accepts 1468 species in 83 genera:

A

Acutipetala
Acutipetala Dankittipakul & Zhang, 2008
 Acutipetala donglini Dankittipakul & Zhang, 2008 — Thailand
 Acutipetala octoginta Dankittipakul & Zhang, 2008 (type) — Thailand

Agelena
Agelena Walckenaer, 1805
 Agelena agelenoides (Walckenaer, 1841) — Western Mediterranean
 Agelena annulipedella Strand, 1913 — Central Africa
 Agelena atlantea Fage, 1938 — Morocco
 Agelena australis Simon, 1896 — South Africa
 Agelena babai Tanikawa, 2005 — Japan
 Agelena barunae Tikader, 1970 — India
 Agelena borbonica Vinson, 1863 — Réunion
 Agelena canariensis Lucas, 1838 — Canary Is., Morocco, Algeria
 Agelena chayu Zhang, Zhu & Song, 2005 — China
 Agelena choi Paik, 1965 — Korea
 Agelena consociata Denis, 1965 — Gabon
 Agelena cuspidata Zhang, Zhu & Song, 2005 — China
 Agelena doris Hogg, 1922 — Vietnam
 Agelena dubiosa Strand, 1908 — Ethiopia, Rwanda
 Agelena funerea Simon, 1909 — East Africa
 Agelena gaerdesi Roewer, 1955 — Namibia
 Agelena gautami Tikader, 1962 — India
 Agelena gomerensis Wunderlich, 1992 — Canary Is.
 Agelena gonzalezi Schmidt, 1980 — Canary Is.
 Agelena hirsutissima Caporiacco, 1940 — Ethiopia
 Agelena howelli Benoit, 1978 — Tanzania
 Agelena incertissima Caporiacco, 1939 — Ethiopia
 Agelena inda Simon, 1897 — India
 Agelena injuria Fox, 1936 — China
 Agelena jaundea Roewer, 1955 — Cameroon
 Agelena jirisanensis Paik, 1965 — Korea
 Agelena jumbo Strand, 1913 — Central Africa
 Agelena jumbo kiwuensis Strand, 1913 — East Africa
 Agelena keniana Roewer, 1955 — Kenya
 Agelena kiboschensis Lessert, 1915 — Central, East Africa
 Agelena labyrinthica (Clerck, 1757) (type) — Europe to Central Asia, China, Korea, Japan
 Agelena lawrencei Roewer, 1955 — Zimbabwe
 Agelena limbata Thorell, 1897 — China, Korea, Myanmar, Laos
 Agelena lingua Strand, 1913 — Central Africa
 Agelena littoricola Strand, 1913 — Central Africa
 Agelena longimamillata Roewer, 1955 — Mozambique
 Agelena longipes Carpenter, 1900 — Britain
 Agelena lukla Nishikawa, 1980 — Nepal, China
 Agelena maracandensis (Charitonov, 1946) — Central Asia
 Agelena moschiensis Roewer, 1955 — Tanzania
 Agelena mossambica Roewer, 1955 — Mozambique
 Agelena nigra Caporiacco, 1940 — Ethiopia
 Agelena nyassana Roewer, 1955 — Malawi
 Agelena oaklandensis Barman, 1979 — India
 Agelena orientalis C. L. Koch, 1837 — Italy to Central Asia, Iran
 Agelena poliosata Wang, 1991 — China
 Agelena republicana Darchen, 1967 — Gabon
 Agelena satmila Tikader, 1970 — India
 Agelena secsuensis Lendl, 1898 — China
 Agelena sherpa Nishikawa, 1980 — Nepal
 Agelena shillongensis Tikader, 1969 — India
 Agelena silvatica Oliger, 1983 — Russia (Far East), China, Japan
 Agelena suboculata Simon, 1910 — Namibia
 †Agelena tabida C. L. Koch & Berendt, 1854 — Palaeogene Baltic amber
 Agelena tadzhika Andreeva, 1976 — Russia (Europe) to Central Asia
 Agelena tenerifensis Wunderlich, 1992 — Canary Is.
 Agelena tenuella Roewer, 1955 — Cameroon
 Agelena tenuis Hogg, 1922 — Vietnam
 Agelena teteana Roewer, 1955 — Mozambique
 Agelena tungchis Lee, 1998 — Taiwan
 Agelena zuluana Roewer, 1955 — South Africa

Agelenella
Agelenella Lehtinen, 1967
 Agelenella pusilla (Pocock, 1903) (type) — Yemen (mainland, Socotra)

Agelenopsis

Agelenopsis Giebel, 1869
 Agelenopsis actuosa (Gertsch & Ivie, 1936) — USA, Canada
 Agelenopsis aleenae Chamberlin & Ivie, 1935 — USA
 Agelenopsis aperta (Gertsch, 1934) — USA, Mexico
 Agelenopsis emertoni Chamberlin & Ivie, 1935 — USA
 Agelenopsis kastoni Chamberlin & Ivie, 1941 — USA
 Agelenopsis longistyla (Banks, 1901) — USA
 Agelenopsis naevia (Walckenaer, 1841) — USA, Canada
 Agelenopsis oklahoma (Gertsch, 1936) — USA, Canada
 Agelenopsis oregonensis Chamberlin & Ivie, 1935 — USA, Canada
 Agelenopsis pennsylvanica (C. L. Koch, 1843) — USA
 Agelenopsis potteri (Blackwall, 1846) (type) — North America. Introduced to Ukraine, Russia (Europe, Far East), Kyrgyzstan
 Agelenopsis riechertae Bosco & Chuang, 2018 — USA
 Agelenopsis spatula Chamberlin & Ivie, 1935 — USA
 Agelenopsis utahana (Chamberlin & Ivie, 1933) — USA, Canada

Ageleradix
Ageleradix Xu & Li, 2007
 Ageleradix cymbiforma (Wang, 1991) — China
 Ageleradix otiforma (Wang, 1991) — China
 Ageleradix schwendingeri Zhang, Li & Xu, 2008 — China
 Ageleradix sichuanensis Xu & Li, 2007 (type) — China
 Ageleradix sternseptum Zhang, Li & Xu, 2008 — China
 Ageleradix zhishengi Zhang, Li & Xu, 2008 — China

Agelescape
Agelescape Levy, 1996
 Agelescape affinis (Kulczyński, 1911) — Turkey, Syria
 Agelescape caucasica Guseinov, Marusik & Koponen, 2005 — Greece, Azerbaijan
 Agelescape dunini Guseinov, Marusik & Koponen, 2005 — Azerbaijan
 Agelescape gideoni Levy, 1996 — Turkey to Israel, Iran
 Agelescape levyi Guseinov, Marusik & Koponen, 2005 — Azerbaijan
 Agelescape livida (Simon, 1875) (type) — Mediterranean
 Agelescape talyshica Guseinov, Marusik & Koponen, 2005 — Azerbaijan

Ahua
Ahua Forster & Wilton, 1973
 Ahua dentata Forster & Wilton, 1973 — New Zealand
 Ahua insula Forster & Wilton, 1973 — New Zealand
 Ahua kaituna Forster & Wilton, 1973 — New Zealand
 Ahua vulgaris Forster & Wilton, 1973 (type) — New Zealand

Allagelena

Allagelena Zhang, Zhu & Song, 2006
 Allagelena bifida (Wang, 1997) — China
 Allagelena bistriata (Grube, 1861) (type) — Russia (Far East), China
 Allagelena difficilis (Fox, 1936) — China, Korea
 Allagelena donggukensis (Kim, 1996) — Korea, Japan
 Allagelena gracilens (C. L. Koch, 1841) — Europe to Central Asia
 Allagelena koreana (Paik, 1965) — China, Korea
 Allagelena monticola Chami-Kranon, Likhitrakarn & Dankittipakul, 2007 — Thailand
 Allagelena opulenta (L. Koch, 1878) — Korea, Japan
 Allagelena scopulata (Wang, 1991) — China

Alloclubionoides
Alloclubionoides Paik, 1992
 Alloclubionoides amurensis (Ovtchinnikov, 1999) — Russia (Far East)
 Alloclubionoides bifidus (Paik, 1976) — Korea
 Alloclubionoides cochlea (Kim, Lee & Kwon, 2007) — Korea
 Alloclubionoides coreanus Paik, 1992 (type) — Korea
 Alloclubionoides dimidiatus (Paik, 1974) — Korea
 Alloclubionoides euini (Paik, 1976) — Korea
 Alloclubionoides geumensis Seo, 2014 — Korea
 Alloclubionoides grandivulvus (Yaginuma, 1969) — Japan
 Alloclubionoides huanren Zhang, Zhu & Wang, 2017 — China
 Alloclubionoides hwaseongensis Kim, Yoo & Lee, 2018 — Korea
 Alloclubionoides imi Kim, Yoo & Lee, 2018 — Korea
 Alloclubionoides jaegeri (Kim, 2007) — Korea
 Alloclubionoides jirisanensis Kim, 2009 — Korea
 Alloclubionoides kimi (Paik, 1974) — Korea
 Alloclubionoides lunatus (Paik, 1976) — Korea
 Alloclubionoides mandzhuricus (Ovtchinnikov, 1999) — Russia (Far East)
 Alloclubionoides meniscatus (Zhu & Wang, 1991) — China
 Alloclubionoides naejangensis Seo, 2014 — Korea
 Alloclubionoides namhaensis Seo, 2014 — Korea
 Alloclubionoides namhansanensis Kim, Yoo & Lee, 2018 — Korea
 Alloclubionoides napolovi (Ovtchinnikov, 1999) — Russia (Far East)
 Alloclubionoides nariceus (Zhu & Wang, 1994) — China
 Alloclubionoides nasuta Kim, Yoo & Lee, 2018 — Korea
 Alloclubionoides ovatus (Paik, 1976) — Korea
 Alloclubionoides paiki (Ovtchinnikov, 1999) — Russia (Far East)
 Alloclubionoides paikwunensis (Kim & Jung, 1993) — Korea
 Alloclubionoides pseudonariceus (Zhang, Zhu & Song, 2007) — China
 Alloclubionoides quadrativulvus (Paik, 1974) — Korea
 Alloclubionoides rostratus (Song, Zhu, Gao & Guan, 1993) — China
 Alloclubionoides solea Kim & Kim, 2012 — Korea
 Alloclubionoides terdecimus (Paik, 1978) — Korea
 Alloclubionoides triangulatus (Zhang, Zhu & Song, 2007) — China
 Alloclubionoides trisaccatus (Zhang, Zhu & Song, 2007) — China
 Alloclubionoides wolchulsanensis Kim, 2009 — Korea
 Alloclubionoides yangyangensis Seo, 2014 — Korea

Aterigena
Aterigena Bolzern, Hänggi & Burckhardt, 2010
 Aterigena aculeata (Wang, 1992) — China
 Aterigena aliquoi (Brignoli, 1971) — Italy (Sicily)
 Aterigena aspromontensis Bolzern, Hänggi & Burckhardt, 2010 — Italy
 Aterigena ligurica (Simon, 1916) (type) — France, Italy
 Aterigena soriculata (Simon, 1873) — France (Corsica), Italy (Sardinia)

Azerithonica
Azerithonica Guseinov, Marusik & Koponen, 2005
 Azerithonica hyrcanica Guseinov, Marusik & Koponen, 2005 (type) — Azerbaijan

B

Bajacalilena
Bajacalilena Maya-Morales & Jiménez, 2017
 Bajacalilena bolzerni Maya-Morales & Jiménez, 2017 — Mexico
 Bajacalilena clarki Maya-Morales & Jiménez, 2017 (type) — Mexico

Barronopsis
Barronopsis Chamberlin & Ivie, 1941
 Barronopsis arturoi Alayón, 1993 — Cuba
 Barronopsis barrowsi (Gertsch, 1934) (type) — USA, Cuba, Hispaniola
 Barronopsis floridensis (Roth, 1954) — USA, Bahama Is.
 Barronopsis jeffersi (Muma, 1945) — USA, Cuba
 Barronopsis pelempito Alayón, 2012 — Hispaniola
 Barronopsis stephaniae Stocks, 2009 — USA
 Barronopsis texana (Gertsch, 1934) — USA

Benoitia
Benoitia Lehtinen, 1967
 Benoitia agraulosa (Wang & Wang, 1991) — China
 Benoitia bornemiszai (Caporiacco, 1947) (type) — East Africa
 Benoitia deserticola (Simon, 1910) — Namibia, Botswana
 Benoitia lepida (O. Pickard-Cambridge, 1876) — Spain, North Africa, Turkey, Cyprus, Israel, Yemen, Saudi-Arabia, Kuwait, Iraq, Iran
 Benoitia ocellata (Pocock, 1900) — South Africa
 Benoitia raymondeae (Lessert, 1915) — East Africa
 Benoitia rhodesiae (Pocock, 1901) — Southern Africa
 Benoitia timida (Audouin, 1826) — Egypt, Israel
 Benoitia upembana (Roewer, 1955) — Congo

Bifidocoelotes
Bifidocoelotes Wang, 2002
 Bifidocoelotes bifidus (Wang, Tso & Wu, 2001) (type) — Taiwan
 Bifidocoelotes obscurus Zhou, Yuen & Zhang, 2017 — China (Hong Kong)
 Bifidocoelotes primus (Fox, 1937) — China (Hong Kong)

C

Cabolena
Cabolena Maya-Morales & Jiménez, 2017
 Cabolena huiztocatl Maya-Morales & Jiménez, 2017 — Mexico
 Cabolena kosatli Maya-Morales, Jiménez & Palacios-Cardiel, 2017 (type) — Mexico
 Cabolena sotol Maya-Morales, Jiménez & Palacios-Cardiel, 2017 — Mexico

Calilena
Calilena Chamberlin & Ivie, 1941
 Calilena absoluta (Gertsch, 1936) — USA
 Calilena adna Chamberlin & Ivie, 1941 — USA
 Calilena angelena Chamberlin & Ivie, 1941 — USA, Mexico
 Calilena arizonica Chamberlin & Ivie, 1941 — USA
 Calilena californica (Banks, 1896) — USA
 Calilena gertschi Chamberlin & Ivie, 1941 — USA
 Calilena gosoga Chamberlin & Ivie, 1941 — USA
 Calilena magna Chamberlin & Ivie, 1941 — USA
 Calilena nita Chamberlin & Ivie, 1941 — USA
 Calilena peninsulana (Banks, 1898) — Mexico
 Calilena restricta Chamberlin & Ivie, 1941 — USA
 Calilena restricta dixiana Chamberlin & Ivie, 1941 — USA
 Calilena saylori Chamberlin & Ivie, 1941 (type) — USA
 Calilena siva Chamberlin & Ivie, 1941 — USA
 Calilena stylophora Chamberlin & Ivie, 1941 — USA
 Calilena stylophora laguna Chamberlin & Ivie, 1941 — USA
 Calilena stylophora oregona Chamberlin & Ivie, 1941 — USA
 Calilena stylophora pomona Chamberlin & Ivie, 1941 — USA
 Calilena umatilla Chamberlin & Ivie, 1941 — USA
 Calilena umatilla schizostyla Chamberlin & Ivie, 1941 — USA
 Calilena yosemita Chamberlin & Ivie, 1941 — USA

Callidalena
Callidalena Maya-Morales & Jiménez, 2017
 Callidalena quintin Maya-Morales & Jiménez, 2017 (type) — Mexico
 Callidalena tijuana Maya-Morales & Jiménez, 2017 — USA, Mexico

Coelotes

Coelotes Blackwall, 1841
 Coelotes acerbus Liu, Li & Pham, 2010 — Vietnam
 Coelotes adnexus Zhang, Zhu & Wang, 2017 — China
 Coelotes aguniensis Shimojana, 2000 — Japan (Ryukyu Is.)
 Coelotes akakinaensis Shimojana, 2000 — Japan (Ryukyu Is.)
 Coelotes albimontanus Nishikawa, 2009 — Japan
 Coelotes alpinus Polenec, 1972 — Italy, Austria, Slovenia
 Coelotes amamiensis Shimojana, 1989 — Japan (Ryukyu Is.)
 Coelotes amplilamnis Saito, 1936 — China
 Coelotes antri (Komatsu, 1961) — Japan
 Coelotes arganoi Brignoli, 1978 — Turkey
 Coelotes aritai Nishikawa, 2009 — Japan
 Coelotes atropos (Walckenaer, 1830) (type) — Europe
 Coelotes bifurcatus Okumura & Ono, 2006 — Japan
 Coelotes biprocessis Zhang, Zhu & Wang, 2017 — China
 Coelotes brachiatus Wang, Yin, Peng & Xie, 1990 — China
 Coelotes brevis Xu & Li, 2007 — China
 Coelotes capacilimbus Xu & Li, 2006 — China
 Coelotes caudatus de Blauwe, 1973 — Lebanon
 Coelotes cavicola (Komatsu, 1961) — Japan
 Coelotes charitonovi Spassky, 1939 — Central Asia
 Coelotes chenzhou Zhang & Yin, 2001 — China
 Coelotes chishuiensis Zhang, Zhu & Wang, 2017 — China
 Coelotes coenobita Brignoli, 1978 — Turkey
 Coelotes colosseus Xu & Li, 2007 — China
 Coelotes conversus Xu & Li, 2006 — China
 Coelotes cornutus Nishikawa, 2009 — Japan
 Coelotes cristiformis Jiang, Chen & Zhang, 2018 — China
 Coelotes curvilamnis Ovtchinnikov, 2000 — Kyrgyzstan
 Coelotes curvilamnis alatauensis Ovtchinnikov, 2000 — Kazakhstan, Kyrgyzstan
 Coelotes curvilamnis boomensis Ovtchinnikov, 2000 — Kyrgyzstan
 Coelotes cylistus Peng & Wang, 1997 — China
 Coelotes decolor Nishikawa, 1973 — Japan
 Coelotes degeneratus Liu & Li, 2009 — China
 Coelotes doii Nishikawa, 2009 — Japan
 Coelotes dormans Nishikawa, 2009 — Japan
 Coelotes eharai Arita, 1976 — Japan
 Coelotes enasanus Nishikawa, 2009 — Japan
 Coelotes everesti Hu, 2001 — China
 Coelotes exaptus Banks, 1898 — Mexico
 Coelotes exilis Nishikawa, 2009 — Japan
 Coelotes exitialis L. Koch, 1878 — Korea, Japan
 Coelotes fanjingensis Zhang, Zhu & Wang, 2017 — China
 Coelotes fujian Zhang, Zhu & Wang, 2017 — China
 Coelotes furvus Liu, Li & Pham, 2010 — Vietnam
 Coelotes galeiformis Wang, Yin, Peng & Xie, 1990 — China
 Coelotes gifuensis Nishikawa, 2009 — Japan
 Coelotes globasus (Wang, Peng & Kim, 1996) — China
 Coelotes gotoensis Okumura, 2007 — Japan
 Coelotes guttatus Wang, Yin, Peng & Xie, 1990 — China
 Coelotes hachijoensis Ono, 2008 — Japan
 Coelotes hamamurai Yaginuma, 1967 — Japan
 Coelotes hataensis Nishikawa, 2009 — Japan
 Coelotes hexommatus (Komatsu, 1957) — Japan
 Coelotes hikonensis Nishikawa, 2009 — Japan
 Coelotes hiradoensis Okumura & Ono, 2006 — Japan
 Coelotes hiratsukai Arita, 1976 — Japan
 Coelotes hiruzenensis Nishikawa, 2009 — Japan
 Coelotes hiurai Nishikawa, 2009 — Japan
 Coelotes ibukiensis Nishikawa, 2009 — Japan
 Coelotes icohamatus Zhu & Wang, 1991 — China
 Coelotes iharai Okumura, 2007 — Japan
 Coelotes iheyaensis Shimojana, 2000 — Japan (Ryukyu Is.)
 Coelotes ikiensis Nishikawa, 2009 — Japan
 Coelotes improprius (Wang, Griswold & Miller, 2010) — China
 Coelotes indentatus Zhang, Zhu & Wang, 2017 — China
 Coelotes insulanus Shimojana, 2000 — Japan (Ryukyu Is.)
 Coelotes introhamatus Xu & Li, 2006 — China
 Coelotes iriei Okumura, 2013 — Japan
 Coelotes italicus Kritscher, 1956 — Italy
 Coelotes iyoensis Nishikawa, 2009 — Japan
 Coelotes izenaensis Shimojana, 2000 — Japan (Ryukyu Is.)
 Coelotes jianfenglingensis (Liu & Li, 2009) — China
 Coelotes juglandicola Ovtchinnikov, 1984 — Kyrgyzstan
 Coelotes kagaensis Nishikawa, 2009 — Japan
 Coelotes kakeromaensis Shimojana, 2000 — Japan (Ryukyu Is.)
 Coelotes katsurai Nishikawa, 2009 — Japan
 Coelotes keramaensis Shimojana, 2000 — Japan (Ryukyu Is.)
 Coelotes kimi Kim & Park, 2009 — Korea
 Coelotes kintaroi Nishikawa, 1983 — Japan
 Coelotes kirgisicus Ovtchinnikov, 2000 — Kyrgyzstan
 Coelotes kitazawai Yaginuma, 1972 — Japan
 Coelotes koshikiensis Okumura, 2013 — Japan
 Coelotes kumejimanus Shimojana, 2000 — Japan (Ryukyu Is.)
 Coelotes kumensis Shimojana, 1989 — Japan (Ryukyu Is.)
 Coelotes lamellatus Nishikawa, 2009 — Japan
 Coelotes laohuanglongensis Liu & Li, 2009 — China
 Coelotes ledongensis Zhang, Zhu & Wang, 2017 — China
 Coelotes luculli Brignoli, 1978 — Turkey
 Coelotes maculatus Zhang, Peng & Kim, 1997 — China
 Coelotes mastrucatus Wang, Yin, Peng & Xie, 1990 — China
 Coelotes mediocris Kulczyński, 1887 — Switzerland, Italy, Ukraine?
 Coelotes micado Strand, 1907 — Japan
 Coelotes microps Schenkel, 1963 — China
 Coelotes minobusanus Nishikawa, 2009 — Japan
 Coelotes minoensis Nishikawa, 2009 — Japan
 Coelotes miyakoensis Shimojana, 2000 — Japan (Ryukyu Is.)
 Coelotes modestus Simon, 1880 — China, Japan
 Coelotes mohrii Nishikawa, 2009 — Japan
 Coelotes motobuensis Shimojana, 2000 — Japan (Ryukyu Is.)
 Coelotes multannulatus Zhang, Zhu, Sun & Song, 2006 — China
 Coelotes musashiensis Nishikawa, 1989 — Japan
 Coelotes nagaraensis Nishikawa, 2009 — Japan
 Coelotes nasensis Shimojana, 2000 — Japan (Ryukyu Is.)
 Coelotes nazuna Nishikawa, 2009 — Japan
 Coelotes nenilini Ovtchinnikov, 1999 — Uzbekistan
 Coelotes ningmingensis Peng, Yan, Liu & Kim, 1998 — China
 Coelotes noctulus Wang, Yin, Peng & Xie, 1990 — China
 Coelotes notoensis Nishikawa, 2009 — Japan
 Coelotes obako Nishikawa, 1983 — Japan
 Coelotes obtusangulus Luo & Chen, 2015 — China
 Coelotes ogatai Nishikawa, 2009 — Japan
 Coelotes okinawensis Shimojana, 1989 — Japan (Ryukyu Is.)
 Coelotes osamui Nishikawa, 2009 — Japan
 Coelotes osellai de Blauwe, 1973 — Italy
 Coelotes oshimaensis Shimojana, 2000 — Japan (Ryukyu Is.)
 Coelotes oxyacanthus Okumura, 2013 — Japan
 Coelotes pabulator Simon, 1875 — France, Switzerland
 Coelotes pastoralis Ovtchinnikov, 2000 — Kazakhstan, Kyrgyzstan
 Coelotes pedodentalis Zhang, Zhu, Sun & Song, 2006 — China
 Coelotes perbrevis Liu, Li & Pham, 2010 — Vietnam
 Coelotes personatus Nishikawa, 1973 — Japan
 Coelotes pervicax Hu & Li, 1987 — China
 Coelotes phthisicus Brignoli, 1978 — Turkey
 Coelotes pickardi O. Pickard-Cambridge, 1873 — Switzerland, Italy
 Coelotes pickardi carpathensis Ovtchinnikov, 1999 — Ukraine
 Coelotes pickardi pastor Simon, 1875 — France
 Coelotes pickardi tirolensis (Kulczyński, 1906) — Switzerland, Italy, Ukraine?
 Coelotes poleneci Wiehle, 1964 — Austria, Slovenia
 Coelotes polyedricus Liu, Li & Pham, 2010 — Vietnam
 Coelotes poricus Zhang, Zhu & Wang, 2017 — China
 Coelotes poweri Simon, 1875 — France
 Coelotes processus Xu & Li, 2007 — China
 Coelotes progressoridentes Ovtchinnikov, 2000 — Kyrgyzstan
 Coelotes quadratus Wang, Yin, Peng & Xie, 1990 — China
 Coelotes rhododendri Brignoli, 1978 — Turkey
 Coelotes robustior Nishikawa, 2009 — Japan
 Coelotes robustus Wang, Yin, Peng & Xie, 1990 — China
 Coelotes rudolfi (Schenkel, 1925) — Switzerland
 Coelotes rugosus (Wang, Peng & Kim, 1996) — China
 Coelotes saccatus Peng & Yin, 1998 — China
 Coelotes saikaiensis Okumura, 2013 — Japan
 Coelotes sanoi Nishikawa, 2009 — Japan
 Coelotes sawadai Nishikawa, 2009 — Japan
 Coelotes septus Wang, Yin, Peng & Xie, 1990 — China
 Coelotes serpentinus Jiang, Chen & Zhang, 2018 — China
 Coelotes shimajiriensis Shimojana, 2000 — Japan (Ryukyu Is.)
 Coelotes simplex O. Pickard-Cambridge, 1885 — China (Yarkand)
 Coelotes sinopensis Danişman, Karanfil & Coşar, 2016 — Turkey
 Coelotes sinuolatus Zhang, Zhu & Wang, 2017 — China
 Coelotes solitarius L. Koch, 1868 — Europe
 Coelotes songae Liu, Li & Pham, 2010 — Vietnam
 Coelotes sordidus Ovtchinnikov, 2000 — Kazakhstan, Kyrgyzstan
 Coelotes striatilamnis Ovtchinnikov, 2000 — Kazakhstan, Kyrgyzstan
 Coelotes striatilamnis ketmenensis Ovtchinnikov, 2001 — Kazakhstan
 Coelotes stylifer Caporiacco, 1935 — Kashmir
 Coelotes suruga Nishikawa, 2009 — Japan
 Coelotes suthepicus Dankittipakul, Chami-Kranon & Wang, 2005 — Thailand
 Coelotes takanawaensis Nishikawa, 2009 — Japan
 Coelotes taurus Nishikawa, 2009 — Japan
 Coelotes tegenarioides O. Pickard-Cambridge, 1885 — China (Yarkand)
 Coelotes tenutubilaris Zhang, Zhu & Wang, 2017 — China
 Coelotes terrestris (Wider, 1834) — Europe, Turkey
 Coelotes tiantangensis Luo & Chen, 2015 — China
 Coelotes tiantongensis Zhang, Peng & Kim, 1997 — China
 Coelotes titaniacus Brignoli, 1977 — Greece
 Coelotes tochigiensis Nishikawa, 2009 — Japan
 Coelotes tojoi Nishikawa, 2009 — Japan
 Coelotes tokaraensis Shimojana, 2000 — Japan (Ryukyu Is.)
 Coelotes tokunoshimaensis Shimojana, 2000 — Japan (Ryukyu Is.)
 Coelotes tominagai Nishikawa, 2009 — Japan
 Coelotes tonakiensis Shimojana, 2000 — Japan (Ryukyu Is.)
 Coelotes transiliensis Ovtchinnikov, 2000 — Kazakhstan, Kyrgyzstan
 Coelotes troglocaecus Shimojana & Nishihira, 2000 — Japan (Okinawa)
 Coelotes turkestanicus Ovtchinnikov, 1999 — Russia (Europe) to Central Asia
 Coelotes uncatus Liu & Li, 2009 — China
 Coelotes undulatus Hu & Wang, 1990 — China
 Coelotes unicatus Yaginuma, 1977 — Japan
 Coelotes unzenensis Okumura, 2013 — Japan
 Coelotes uozumii Nishikawa, 2002 — Japan
 Coelotes vallei Brignoli, 1977 — Italy
 Coelotes vestigialis Xu & Li, 2007 — China
 Coelotes vignai Brignoli, 1978 — Turkey
 Coelotes wangi Chen & Zhao, 1997 — China
 Coelotes xinjiangensis Hu, 1992 — China
 Coelotes yaginumai Nishikawa, 1972 — Japan
 Coelotes yahagiensis Nishikawa, 2009 — Japan
 Coelotes yambaruensis Shimojana, 2000 — Japan (Ryukyu Is.)
 Coelotes yodoensis Nishikawa, 1977 — Japan
 Coelotes zaoensis Nishikawa, 2009 — Japan

Coras

Coras Simon, 1898
 Coras aerialis Muma, 1946 — USA
 Coras alabama Muma, 1946 — USA
 Coras angularis Muma, 1944 — USA
 Coras cavernorum Barrows, 1940 — USA
 Coras crescentis Muma, 1944 — USA
 Coras furcatus Muma, 1946 — USA
 Coras juvenilis (Keyserling, 1881) — USA
 Coras kisatchie Muma, 1946 — USA
 Coras lamellosus (Keyserling, 1887) — USA
 Coras medicinalis (Hentz, 1821) (type) — USA, Canada
 Coras montanus (Emerton, 1890) — USA, Canada
 Coras parallelis Muma, 1944 — USA
 Coras perplexus Muma, 1946 — USA
 Coras seorakensis Seo, 2014 — Korea
 Coras taugynus Chamberlin, 1925 — USA
 Coras tennesseensis Muma, 1946 — USA

D

Dichodactylus
Dichodactylus Okumura, 2017
 Dichodactylus inabaensis (Arita, 1974) — Japan
 Dichodactylus satoi (Nishikawa, 2003) — Japan
 Dichodactylus shinshuensis Okumura, 2017 — Japan
 Dichodactylus tarumii (Arita, 1976) (type) — Japan

Draconarius
Draconarius Ovtchinnikov, 1999
 Draconarius abbreviatus Dankittipakul & Wang, 2003 — Thailand
 Draconarius absentis Wang, 2003 — China
 Draconarius acidentatus (Peng & Yin, 1998) — China
 Draconarius acroprocessus Zhang, Zhu & Wang, 2017 — China
 Draconarius acutus Xu & Li, 2008 — China
 Draconarius adligansus (Peng & Yin, 1998) — China
 Draconarius adnatus Wang, Griswold & Miller, 2010 — China
 Draconarius agrestis Wang, 2003 — China
 Draconarius altissimus (Hu, 2001) — China
 Draconarius anceps Wang, Griswold & Miller, 2010 — China
 Draconarius anthonyi Dankittipakul & Wang, 2003 — Thailand
 Draconarius arcuatus (Chen, 1984) — China
 Draconarius argenteus (Wang, Yin, Peng & Xie, 1990) — China
 Draconarius aspinatus (Wang, Yin, Peng & Xie, 1990) — China
 Draconarius auriculatus Xu & Li, 2006 — China
 Draconarius auriformis Xu & Li, 2007 — China
 Draconarius australis Dankittipakul, Sonthichai & Wang, 2006 — Thailand
 Draconarius bannaensis Liu & Li, 2010 — China
 Draconarius baronii (Brignoli, 1978) — Bhutan
 Draconarius baxiantaiensis Wang, 2003 — China
 Draconarius beloniforis Wang & Martens, 2009 — Nepal
 Draconarius bifarius Wang & Martens, 2009 — Nepal
 Draconarius bituberculatus (Wang, Yin, Peng & Xie, 1990) — China
 Draconarius bounnami Wang & Jäger, 2008 — Laos
 Draconarius brachialis Xu & Li, 2007 — China
 Draconarius brevikarenos Wang & Martens, 2009 — Nepal
 Draconarius brunneus (Hu & Li, 1987) — China
 Draconarius calcariformis (Wang, 1994) — China
 Draconarius cangshanensis Zhang, Zhu & Wang, 2017 — China
 Draconarius capitellus Wang & Martens, 2009 — Nepal
 Draconarius carinatus (Wang, Yin, Peng & Xie, 1990) — China
 Draconarius catillus Wang, Griswold & Miller, 2010 — China
 Draconarius cavernalis (Huang, Peng & Li, 2002) — China
 Draconarius cavus Zhang, Zhu & Wang, 2017 — China
 Draconarius chaiqiaoensis (Zhang, Peng & Kim, 1997) — China
 Draconarius cheni (Platnick, 1989) — China
 Draconarius chuandian Zhang, Zhu & Wang, 2017 — China
 Draconarius clavellatus Liu, Li & Pham, 2010 — Vietnam
 Draconarius cochleariformis Liu & Li, 2009 — China
 Draconarius colubrinus Zhang, Zhu & Song, 2002 — China
 Draconarius communis Wang & Martens, 2009 — Nepal
 Draconarius complanatus Xu & Li, 2008 — China
 Draconarius condocephalus Wang & Martens, 2009 — Nepal
 Draconarius confusus Wang & Martens, 2009 — Nepal
 Draconarius contiguus Wang & Martens, 2009 — Nepal
 Draconarius coreanus (Paik & Yaginuma, 1969) — Korea, Japan
 Draconarius cucphuongensis Liu, Li & Pham, 2010 — Vietnam
 Draconarius cucullatus Zhang, Zhu & Wang, 2017 — China
 Draconarius curiosus Wang, 2003 — China
 Draconarius curvabilis Wang & Jäger, 2007 — China
 Draconarius curvus Wang, Griswold & Miller, 2010 — China
 Draconarius cylindratus Wang & Martens, 2009 — Nepal
 Draconarius dapaensis Wang & Martens, 2009 — Nepal
 Draconarius davidi (Schenkel, 1963) — China
 Draconarius denisi (Schenkel, 1963) — China
 Draconarius dialeptus Okumura, 2013 — Japan
 Draconarius digituliscaput Chen, Zhu & Kim, 2008 — China
 Draconarius digitusiformis (Wang, Yin, Peng & Xie, 1990) — China
 Draconarius disgregus Wang, 2003 — China
 Draconarius dissitus Wang, 2003 — China
 Draconarius distinctus Wang & Martens, 2009 — Nepal
 Draconarius dorsicephalus Wang & Martens, 2009 — Nepal
 Draconarius dorsiprocessus Zhang, Zhu & Wang, 2017 — China
 Draconarius drepanoides Jiang & Chen, 2015 — China
 Draconarius dubius Wang, 2003 — China
 Draconarius duplus Wang, Griswold & Miller, 2010 — China
 Draconarius elatus Dankittipakul & Wang, 2004 — Thailand
 Draconarius ellipticus Liu, Li & Pham, 2010 — Vietnam
 Draconarius episomos Wang, 2003 — China
 Draconarius euryembolus Wang, Griswold & Miller, 2010 — China
 Draconarius exiguus Liu & Li, 2010 — China
 Draconarius expansus Xu & Li, 2008 — China
 Draconarius flos Wang & Jäger, 2007 — China
 Draconarius gigas Wang, Griswold & Miller, 2010 — China
 Draconarius globulatus Chami-Kranon, Sonthichai & Wang, 2006 — Thailand
 Draconarius gorkhaensis Wang & Martens, 2009 — Nepal
 Draconarius griswoldi Wang, 2003 — China
 Draconarius guizhouensis (Peng, Li & Huang, 2002) — China
 Draconarius guoi Wang, Griswold & Miller, 2010 — China
 Draconarius gurkha (Brignoli, 1976) — Nepal
 Draconarius gyriniformis (Wang & Zhu, 1991) — China
 Draconarius hallaensis Kim & Lee, 2007 — Korea
 Draconarius hangzhouensis (Chen, 1984) — China
 Draconarius hanoiensis Wang & Jäger, 2008 — Vietnam
 Draconarius haopingensis Wang, 2003 — China
 Draconarius harduarae (Biswas & Roy, 2008) — India
 Draconarius hengshanensis (Tang & Yin, 2003) — China
 Draconarius himalayaensis (Hu, 2001) — China
 Draconarius hui (Dankittipakul & Wang, 2003) — China
 Draconarius huizhunesis (Wang & Xu, 1988) — China
 Draconarius huongsonensis Wang & Jäger, 2008 — Vietnam
 Draconarius immensus Xu & Li, 2006 — China
 Draconarius indistinctus (Xu & Li, 2006) — China
 Draconarius infulatus (Wang, Yin, Peng & Xie, 1990) — China
 Draconarius inthanonensis Dankittipakul & Wang, 2003 — Thailand
 Draconarius jiafu Zhang, Zhu & Wang, 2017 — China
 Draconarius jiangyongensis (Peng, Gong & Kim, 1996) — China
 Draconarius joshimath Quasin, Siliwal & Uniyal, 2017 — India
 Draconarius kavanaughi Wang, Griswold & Miller, 2010 — China
 Draconarius kayasanensis (Paik, 1972) — Korea
 Draconarius labiatus (Wang & Ono, 1998) — Taiwan
 Draconarius latellai Marusik & Ballarin, 2011 — Pakistan
 Draconarius lateralis Dankittipakul & Wang, 2004 — Thailand
 Draconarius laticavus Wang, Griswold & Miller, 2010 — China
 Draconarius latidens Wang & Jäger, 2008 — Laos
 Draconarius latiforus Wang & Martens, 2009 — Nepal
 Draconarius latisectus Zhang, Zhu & Wang, 2017 — China
 Draconarius levyi Wang, Griswold & Miller, 2010 — China
 Draconarius lhasa Zhang, Zhu & Wang, 2017 — China
 Draconarius lini Liu & Li, 2009 — China
 Draconarius linxiaensis Wang, 2003 — China
 Draconarius linzhiensis (Hu, 2001) — China
 Draconarius longissimus Liu, Li & Pham, 2010 — Vietnam
 Draconarius longlingensis Wang, Griswold & Miller, 2010 — China
 Draconarius lunularis Zhang, Zhu & Wang, 2017 — China
 Draconarius lutulentus (Wang, Yin, Peng & Xie, 1990) — China
 Draconarius magicus Liu, Li & Pham, 2010 — Vietnam
 Draconarius magnarcuatus Xu & Li, 2008 — China
 Draconarius magniceps (Schenkel, 1936) — China
 Draconarius manus Wang & Zhang, 2018 — China
 Draconarius medogensis Zhang, Zhu & Wang, 2017 — China
 Draconarius meganiger Wang & Martens, 2009 — Nepal
 Draconarius microcoelotes Wang & Martens, 2009 — Nepal
 Draconarius mikrommatos Wang, Griswold & Miller, 2010 — China
 Draconarius molluscus (Wang, Yin, Peng & Xie, 1990) — China
 Draconarius monticola Dankittipakul, Sonthichai & Wang, 2006 — Thailand
 Draconarius montis Dankittipakul, Sonthichai & Wang, 2006 — Thailand
 Draconarius multidentatus Zhang, Zhu & Wang, 2017 — China
 Draconarius mupingensis Xu & Li, 2006 — China
 Draconarius nanyuensis (Peng & Yin, 1998) — China
 Draconarius naranensis Ovtchinnikov, 2005 — Pakistan
 Draconarius neixiangensis (Hu, Wang & Wang, 1991) — China
 Draconarius nudulus Wang, 2003 — China
 Draconarius olorinus Wang, Griswold & Miller, 2010 — China
 Draconarius orbiculatus Zhu, Wang & Zhang, 2017 — China
 Draconarius ornatus (Wang, Yin, Peng & Xie, 1990) — China
 Draconarius ovillus Xu & Li, 2007 — China
 Draconarius pakistanicus Ovtchinnikov, 2005 — Pakistan
 Draconarius panchtharensis Wang & Martens, 2009 — Nepal
 Draconarius papai Chami-Kranon, Sonthichai & Wang, 2006 — Thailand
 Draconarius papillatus Xu & Li, 2006 — China
 Draconarius paracidentatus Zhang, Zhu & Wang, 2017 — China
 Draconarius paraepisomos Wang & Martens, 2009 — Nepal
 Draconarius paralateralis Dankittipakul & Wang, 2004 — Thailand
 Draconarius paralleloides Jiang, Chen & Zhang, 2018 — China
 Draconarius parallelus Liu & Li, 2009 — China
 Draconarius paralutulentus Zhang, Zhu & Wang, 2017 — China
 Draconarius paraspiralis Wang, Griswold & Miller, 2010 — China
 Draconarius paraterebratus Wang, 2003 — China
 Draconarius paratrifasciatus Wang & Jäger, 2007 — China
 Draconarius penicillatus (Wang, Yin, Peng & Xie, 1990) — China
 Draconarius peregrinus Xie & Chen, 2011 — China
 Draconarius phuhin Dankittipakul, Sonthichai & Wang, 2006 — Thailand
 Draconarius phulchokiensis Wang & Martens, 2009 — Nepal
 Draconarius pictus (Hu, 2001) — China
 Draconarius pinguis Jiang, Chen & Zhang, 2018 — China
 Draconarius pollex Zhang, Zhu & Wang, 2017 — China
 Draconarius postremus Wang & Jäger, 2008 — Laos
 Draconarius potanini (Schenkel, 1963) — China
 Draconarius prolixus (Wang, Yin, Peng & Xie, 1990) — China
 Draconarius promontorioides Dankittipakul & Wang, 2008 — Thailand
 Draconarius promontorius Dankittipakul, Sonthichai & Wang, 2006 — Thailand
 Draconarius pseudoagrestis Wang, Griswold & Miller, 2010 — China
 Draconarius pseudoclavellatus Liu, Li & Pham, 2010 — Vietnam
 Draconarius pseudocoreanus Xu & Li, 2008 — China
 Draconarius pseudodissitus Zhang, Zhu & Wang, 2017 — China
 Draconarius pseudogurkha Wang & Martens, 2009 — Nepal
 Draconarius pseudolateralis Dankittipakul & Wang, 2004 — Thailand
 Draconarius pseudomeganiger Wang & Martens, 2009 — Nepal
 Draconarius pseudopumilus Liu, Li & Pham, 2010 — Vietnam
 Draconarius pseudospiralis Wang, Griswold & Miller, 2010 — China
 Draconarius pseudowuermlii Wang, 2003 — China
 Draconarius pumilus Liu, Li & Pham, 2010 — Vietnam
 Draconarius qingzangensis (Hu, 2001) — China
 Draconarius quattour Wang, Griswold & Miller, 2010 — China
 Draconarius renalis Wang, Griswold & Miller, 2010 — China
 Draconarius retrotubularis Zhang, Zhu & Wang, 2017 — China
 Draconarius rimatus Liu, Li & Pham, 2010 — Vietnam
 Draconarius rotulus Liu, Li & Pham, 2010 — Vietnam
 Draconarius rotundus Wang, 2003 — China
 Draconarius rufulus (Wang, Yin, Peng & Xie, 1990) — China
 Draconarius sacculus Wang & Martens, 2009 — Nepal
 Draconarius schawalleri Wang & Martens, 2009 — Nepal
 Draconarius schenkeli (Brignoli, 1978) — Bhutan
 Draconarius schwendingeri Dankittipakul, Sonthichai & Wang, 2006 — Thailand
 Draconarius semicircularis Liu & Li, 2009 — China
 Draconarius semicirculus Wang & Martens, 2009 — Nepal
 Draconarius seorsus Wang & Martens, 2009 — Nepal
 Draconarius siamensis Dankittipakul & Wang, 2003 — Thailand
 Draconarius sichuanensis Wang & Jäger, 2007 — China
 Draconarius silva Dankittipakul, Sonthichai & Wang, 2006 — Thailand
 Draconarius silvicola Dankittipakul, Sonthichai & Wang, 2006 — Thailand
 Draconarius simplicidens Wang, 2003 — China
 Draconarius simplicifolis Wang & Martens, 2009 — Nepal
 Draconarius singulatus (Wang, Yin, Peng & Xie, 1990) — China
 Draconarius songi Wang & Jäger, 2008 — Laos
 Draconarius specialis Xu & Li, 2007 — China
 Draconarius spinosus Wang & Martens, 2009 — Nepal
 Draconarius spiralis Wang, Griswold & Miller, 2010 — China
 Draconarius spirallus Xu & Li, 2007 — China
 Draconarius stemmleri (Brignoli, 1978) — Bhutan
 Draconarius streptus (Zhu & Wang, 1994) — China
 Draconarius striolatus (Wang, Yin, Peng & Xie, 1990) — China
 Draconarius strophadatus (Zhu & Wang, 1991) — China
 Draconarius subabsentis Xu & Li, 2008 — China
 Draconarius subaspinatus Zhang, Zhu & Wang, 2017 — China
 Draconarius subconfusus Wang & Martens, 2009 — Nepal
 Draconarius subdissitus Zhang, Zhu & Wang, 2017 — China
 Draconarius subepisomos Wang & Martens, 2009 — Nepal
 Draconarius sublutulentus Xu & Li, 2008 — China
 Draconarius subrotundus Wang & Martens, 2009 — Nepal
 Draconarius subterebratus Zhang, Zhu & Wang, 2017 — China
 Draconarius subtitanus (Hu, 1992) — China
 Draconarius subulatus Dankittipakul & Wang, 2003 — Thailand
 Draconarius suttisani Dankittipakul & Wang, 2008 — Thailand
 Draconarius syzygiatus (Zhu & Wang, 1994) — China
 Draconarius tabularis Wang & Jäger, 2008 — Laos
 Draconarius tabulatus Zhang, Zhu & Wang, 2017 — China
 Draconarius taihangensis Zhang, Zhu & Wang, 2017 — China
 Draconarius tamdaoensis Liu, Li & Pham, 2010 — Vietnam
 Draconarius tangi Wang, Griswold & Miller, 2010 — China
 Draconarius taplejungensis Wang & Martens, 2009 — Nepal
 Draconarius tensus Xu & Li, 2008 — China
 Draconarius tentus Dankittipakul, Sonthichai & Wang, 2006 — Thailand
 Draconarius terebratus (Peng & Wang, 1997) — China
 Draconarius testudinatus Wang & Martens, 2009 — Nepal
 Draconarius tianlin Zhang, Zhu & Wang, 2017 — China
 Draconarius tiantangensis Xie & Chen, 2011 — China
 Draconarius tibetensis Wang, 2003 — China
 Draconarius tinjuraensis Wang & Martens, 2009 — Nepal
 Draconarius tongi Xu & Li, 2007 — China
 Draconarius transparens Liu, Li & Pham, 2010 — Vietnam
 Draconarius transversus Liu, Li & Pham, 2010 — Vietnam
 Draconarius triatus (Zhu & Wang, 1994) — China
 Draconarius tridens Wang, Griswold & Miller, 2010 — China
 Draconarius trifasciatus (Wang & Zhu, 1991) — China
 Draconarius trinus Wang & Jäger, 2007 — China
 Draconarius tritos Wang & Martens, 2009 — Nepal
 Draconarius tryblionatus (Wang & Zhu, 1991) — China
 Draconarius tubercularis Xu & Li, 2007 — China
 Draconarius turriformis Liu & Li, 2010 — China
 Draconarius uncinatus (Wang, Yin, Peng & Xie, 1990) — China
 Draconarius ventrifurcatus Xu & Li, 2008 — China
 Draconarius venustus Ovtchinnikov, 1999 (type) — Tajikistan
 Draconarius verrucifer Okumura, 2013 — Japan
 Draconarius volubilis Liu, Li & Pham, 2010 — Vietnam
 Draconarius volutobursarius Wang & Martens, 2009 — Nepal
 Draconarius wenzhouensis (Chen, 1984) — China
 Draconarius wolongensis Zhang, Zhu & Wang, 2017 — China
 Draconarius wrasei Wang & Jäger, 2010 — China
 Draconarius wudangensis (Chen & Zhao, 1997) — China
 Draconarius wuermlii (Brignoli, 1978) — Bhutan, Nepal
 Draconarius wugeshanensis (Zhang, Yin & Kim, 2000) — China
 Draconarius xishuiensis Zhang, Zhu & Wang, 2017 — China
 Draconarius xuae Wang, Griswold & Miller, 2010 — China
 Draconarius yadongensis (Hu & Li, 1987) — China, Nepal
 Draconarius yani Wang, Griswold & Miller, 2010 — China
 Draconarius yichengensis Wang, 2003 — China
 Draconarius zonalis Xu & Li, 2008 — China

E

Eratigena

Eratigena Bolzern, Burckhardt & Hänggi, 2013
 Eratigena agrestis (Walckenaer, 1802) — Europe to Central Asia. Introduced to USA, Canada
 Eratigena arganoi (Brignoli, 1971) — Italy
 Eratigena atrica (C. L. Koch, 1843) (type) — Europe. Introduced to Canada, USA
 Eratigena balearica (Brignoli, 1978) — Spain (Balearic Is.)
 Eratigena barrientosi (Bolzern, Crespo & Cardoso, 2009) — Portugal
 Eratigena blanda (Gertsch, 1971) — Mexico
 Eratigena bucculenta (L. Koch, 1868) — Portugal, Spain
 Eratigena caverna (Gertsch, 1971) — Mexico
 Eratigena decora (Gertsch, 1971) — Mexico
 Eratigena duellica (Simon, 1875) — Canada, USA, Europe
 Eratigena edmundoi Bolzern & Hänggi, 2016 — Mexico
 Eratigena feminea (Simon, 1870) — Portugal, Spain, Madeira, Algeria
 Eratigena fernandoi Bolzern & Hänggi, 2016 — Mexico
 Eratigena flexuosa (F. O. Pickard-Cambridge, 1902) — Mexico
 Eratigena florea (Brignoli, 1974) — Mexico
 Eratigena fuesslini (Pavesi, 1873) — Europe, Turkey
 Eratigena gertschi (Roth, 1968) — Mexico
 Eratigena guanato Bolzern & Hänggi, 2016 — Mexico
 Eratigena herculea (Fage, 1931) — Spain (mainland, Ibiza)
 Eratigena hispanica (Fage, 1931) — Spain
 Eratigena incognita (Bolzern, Crespo & Cardoso, 2009) — Portugal
 Eratigena inermis (Simon, 1870) — Portugal, Spain, France
 Eratigena laksao Bolzern & Jäger, 2015 — Laos
 Eratigena mexicana (Roth, 1968) — Mexico
 Eratigena montigena (Simon, 1937) — Portugal, Spain
 Eratigena picta (Simon, 1870) — Europe, North Africa, Caucasus
 Eratigena queretaro Bolzern & Hänggi, 2016 — Mexico
 Eratigena rothi (Gertsch, 1971) — Mexico
 Eratigena saeva (Blackwall, 1844) — Western Europe, Canada
 Eratigena sardoa (Brignoli, 1977) — Sardinia
 Eratigena selva (Roth, 1968) — Mexico
 Eratigena sicana (Brignoli, 1976) — Italy (Sicily, Sardinia)
 Eratigena tlaxcala (Roth, 1968) — Mexico
 Eratigena vidua (Cárdenas & Barrientos, 2011) — Spain
 Eratigena vomeroi (Brignoli, 1977) — Italy
 Eratigena xilitla Bolzern & Hänggi, 2016 — Mexico
 Eratigena yarini Bolzern & Hänggi, 2016 — Mexico

F

Femoracoelotes
Femoracoelotes Wang, 2002
 Femoracoelotes latus (Wang, Tso & Wu, 2001) — Taiwan
 Femoracoelotes platnicki (Wang & Ono, 1998) (type) — Taiwan

Flexicoelotes
Flexicoelotes Chen, Li & Zhao, 2015
 Flexicoelotes huyunensis Chen & Li, 2015 — China
 Flexicoelotes jiaohanyanensis Chen & Li, 2015 (type) — China
 Flexicoelotes jinlongyanensis Chen & Li, 2015 — China
 Flexicoelotes pingzhaiensis Chen & Li, 2015 — China
 Flexicoelotes xingwangensis Chen & Li, 2015 — China

G

Guilotes
Guilotes Zhao & S. Q. Li, 2018
 Guilotes ludiensis Zhao & S. Q. Li, 2018 (type) — China
 Guilotes qingshitanensis Zhao & S. Q. Li, 2018 — China
 Guilotes xingpingensis Zhao & S. Q. Li, 2018 — China
 Guilotes yandongensis Zhao & S. Q. Li, 2018 — China

H

Hadites
Hadites Keyserling, 1862
 Hadites tegenarioides Keyserling, 1862 (type) — Croatia

Hengconarius
Hengconarius Zhao & S. Q. Li, 2018
 Hengconarius dedaensis Zhao & S. Q. Li, 2018 — China
 Hengconarius exilis (Zhang, Zhu & Wang, 2005) (type) — China
 Hengconarius falcatus (Xu & Li, 2006) — China
 Hengconarius incertus (Wang, 2003) — China
 Hengconarius latusincertus (Wang, Griswold & Miller, 2010) — China
 Hengconarius longipalpus Zhao & S. Q. Li, 2018 — China
 Hengconarius longpuensis Zhao & S. Q. Li, 2018 — China
 Hengconarius pseudobrunneus (Wang, 2003) — China

Himalcoelotes
Himalcoelotes Wang, 2002
 Himalcoelotes aequoreus Wang, 2002 — Nepal
 Himalcoelotes brignolii Wang, 2002 — Bhutan
 Himalcoelotes bursarius Wang, 2002 — Nepal
 Himalcoelotes diatropos Wang, 2002 — Nepal
 Himalcoelotes gyirongensis (Hu & Li, 1987) — China, Nepal
 Himalcoelotes martensi Wang, 2002 (type) — Nepal
 Himalcoelotes pirum Wang, 2002 — Nepal
 Himalcoelotes sherpa (Brignoli, 1976) — Nepal
 Himalcoelotes subsherpa Wang, 2002 — Nepal
 Himalcoelotes syntomos Wang, 2002 — Nepal
 Himalcoelotes tortuous Zhang & Zhu, 2010 — China
 Himalcoelotes xizangensis (Hu, 1992) — China
 Himalcoelotes zhamensis Zhang & Zhu, 2010 — China

Histopona
Histopona Thorell, 1869
 †Histopona anthracina Bertkau, 1878b — Neogene Rott, Germany
 Histopona bidens (Absolon & Kratochvíl, 1933) — Croatia, Macedonia
 Histopona breviemboli Dimitrov, Deltshev & Lazarov, 2017 — Bulgaria, Turkey (Europe)
 Histopona conveniens (Kulczyński, 1914) — Bosnia-Hercegovina
 Histopona dubia (Absolon & Kratochvíl, 1933) — Croatia, Bosnia-Hercegovina
 Histopona egonpretneri Deeleman-Reinhold, 1983 — Croatia
 Histopona fioni Bolzern, Pantini & Isaia, 2013 — Switzerland, Italy
 Histopona hauseri (Brignoli, 1972) — Greece, Macedonia
 Histopona isolata Deeleman-Reinhold, 1983 — Greece (Crete)
 Histopona italica Brignoli, 1977 — Italy
 Histopona krivosijana (Kratochvíl, 1935) — Montenegro
 Histopona kurkai Deltshev & Indzhov, 2018 — Albania, Macedonia
 Histopona laeta (Kulczyński, 1897) — Balkans
 Histopona leonardoi Bolzern, Pantini & Isaia, 2013 — Switzerland, Italy
 Histopona luxurians (Kulczyński, 1897) — Austria to Ukraine and southeastern Europe
 Histopona myops (Simon, 1885) — South-eastern Europe
 Histopona palaeolithica (Brignoli, 1971) — Italy, Montenegro
 Histopona sinuata (Kulczyński, 1897) — Romania
 Histopona strinatii (Brignoli, 1976) — Greece
 Histopona thaleri Gasparo, 2005 — Greece
 Histopona torpida (C. L. Koch, 1837) (type) — Europe, Caucasus
 Histopona tranteevi Deltshev, 1978 — Bulgaria
 Histopona vignai Brignoli, 1980 — Albania, Macedonia, Greece

Hoffmannilena
Hoffmannilena Maya-Morales & Jiménez, 2016
 Hoffmannilena apoala Maya-Morales & Jiménez, 2016 — Mexico
 Hoffmannilena cumbre Maya-Morales & Jiménez, 2016 — Mexico
 Hoffmannilena huajuapan Maya-Morales & Jiménez, 2016 — Mexico
 Hoffmannilena lobata (F. O. Pickard-Cambridge, 1902) — Mexico
 Hoffmannilena marginata (F. O. Pickard-Cambridge, 1902) — Mexico
 Hoffmannilena mitla Maya-Morales & Jiménez, 2016 — Mexico
 Hoffmannilena nova (O. Pickard-Cambridge, 1896) — Guatemala
 Hoffmannilena tizayuca Maya-Morales & Jiménez, 2016 (type) — Mexico
 Hoffmannilena variabilis (F. O. Pickard-Cambridge, 1902) — Mexico

Hololena

Hololena Chamberlin & Gertsch, 1929
 Hololena adnexa (Chamberlin & Gertsch, 1929) — USA
 Hololena aduma Chamberlin & Ivie, 1942 — USA
 Hololena altura Chamberlin & Ivie, 1942 — USA
 Hololena atypica Chamberlin & Ivie, 1942 — USA
 Hololena barbarana Chamberlin & Ivie, 1942 — USA
 Hololena curta (McCook, 1894) — USA, Canada
 Hololena dana Chamberlin & Ivie, 1942 — USA
 Hololena frianta Chamberlin & Ivie, 1942 — USA
 Hololena furcata (Chamberlin & Gertsch, 1929) — USA
 Hololena hola (Chamberlin, 1928) — USA
 Hololena hopi Chamberlin & Ivie, 1942 — USA
 Hololena lassena Chamberlin & Ivie, 1942 — USA
 Hololena madera Chamberlin & Ivie, 1942 — USA
 Hololena mimoides (Chamberlin, 1919) (type) — USA
 Hololena monterea Chamberlin & Ivie, 1942 — USA
 Hololena nedra Chamberlin & Ivie, 1942 — USA
 Hololena nevada (Chamberlin & Gertsch, 1929) — USA
 Hololena oola Chamberlin & Ivie, 1942 — USA
 Hololena oquirrhensis (Chamberlin & Gertsch, 1930) — USA
 Hololena pacifica (Banks, 1896) — USA
 Hololena parana Chamberlin & Ivie, 1942 — USA
 Hololena pearcei Chamberlin & Ivie, 1942 — USA
 Hololena rabana Chamberlin & Ivie, 1942 — USA
 Hololena santana Chamberlin & Ivie, 1942 — USA
 Hololena septata Chamberlin & Ivie, 1942 — USA, Mexico
 Hololena sidella Chamberlin & Ivie, 1942 — USA
 Hololena sula Chamberlin & Ivie, 1942 — USA
 Hololena tentativa (Chamberlin & Gertsch, 1929) — USA
 Hololena tulareana Chamberlin & Ivie, 1942 — USA
 Hololena turba Chamberlin & Ivie, 1942 — USA

Huangyuania
Huangyuania Song & Li, 1990
 Huangyuania tibetana (Hu & Li, 1987) (type) — China

Huka

Huka Forster & Wilton, 1973
 Huka alba Forster & Wilton, 1973 — New Zealand
 Huka lobata Forster & Wilton, 1973 — New Zealand
 Huka minima Forster & Wilton, 1973 — New Zealand
 Huka minuta Forster & Wilton, 1973 — New Zealand
 Huka pallida Forster & Wilton, 1973 (type) — New Zealand

Hypocoelotes
Hypocoelotes Nishikawa, 2009
 Hypocoelotes tumidivulva (Nishikawa, 1980) (type) — Japan

I-K

†Inceptor
†Inceptor Petrunkevitch, 1942 
 †Inceptor aculeatus Petrunkevitch, 1942(type) — Palaeogene Baltic amber
 †Inceptor dubius Petrunkevitch, 1946 — Palaeogene Baltic amber

Inermocoelotes
Inermocoelotes Ovtchinnikov, 1999
 Inermocoelotes anoplus (Kulczyński, 1897) — Austria, Italy, Eastern Europe
 Inermocoelotes brevispinus (Deltshev & Dimitrov, 1996) — Bulgaria
 Inermocoelotes deltshevi (Dimitrov, 1996) — Macedonia, Bulgaria
 Inermocoelotes drenskii (Deltshev, 1990) — Bulgaria
 Inermocoelotes falciger (Kulczyński, 1897) — Eastern Europe
 Inermocoelotes gasperinii (Simon, 1891) — Croatia
 Inermocoelotes halanensis (Wang, Zhu & Li, 2010) — Croatia
 Inermocoelotes inermis (L. Koch, 1855) (type) — Europe
 Inermocoelotes jurinitschi (Drensky, 1915) — Bulgaria
 Inermocoelotes karlinskii (Kulczyński, 1906) — South-eastern Europe
 Inermocoelotes kulczynskii (Drensky, 1915) — Macedonia, Bulgaria
 Inermocoelotes melovskii Komnenov, 2017 — Macedonia
 Inermocoelotes microlepidus (de Blauwe, 1973) — Italy, Bulgaria
 Inermocoelotes paramicrolepidus (Wang, Zhu & Li, 2010) — Greece
 Inermocoelotes xinpingwangi (Deltshev, 2009) — Bulgaria

Iwogumoa
Iwogumoa Kishida, 1955
 Iwogumoa acco (Nishikawa, 1987) — Japan
 Iwogumoa dalianensis Zhang, Zhu & Wang, 2017 — China
 Iwogumoa dicranata (Wang, Yin, Peng & Xie, 1990) — China
 Iwogumoa ensifer (Wang & Ono, 1998) — Taiwan
 Iwogumoa filamentacea (Tang, Yin & Zhang, 2002) — China
 Iwogumoa illustrata (Wang, Yin, Peng & Xie, 1990) — China
 Iwogumoa insidiosa (L. Koch, 1878) (type) — Russia (Far East), Korea, Japan
 Iwogumoa interuna (Nishikawa, 1977) — Russia (Far East), Korea, Japan
 Iwogumoa longa (Wang, Tso & Wu, 2001) — Taiwan
 Iwogumoa montivaga (Wang & Ono, 1998) — Taiwan
 Iwogumoa nagasakiensis Okumura, 2007 — Japan
 Iwogumoa pengi (Ovtchinnikov, 1999) — China
 Iwogumoa plancyi (Simon, 1880) — China, Japan
 Iwogumoa songminjae (Paik & Yaginuma, 1969) — China, Korea
 Iwogumoa taoyuandong (Bao & Yin, 2004) — China
 Iwogumoa tengchihensis (Wang & Ono, 1998) — Taiwan
 Iwogumoa xieae Liu & Li, 2008 — China
 Iwogumoa xinhuiensis (Chen, 1984) — China, Taiwan
 Iwogumoa yaeyamensis (Shimojana, 1982) — Japan
 Iwogumoa yushanensis (Wang & Ono, 1998) — Taiwan

Kidugua
Kidugua Lehtinen, 1967
 Kidugua spiralis Lehtinen, 1967 (type) — Congo

L

Lagunella
Lagunella Maya-Morales & Jiménez, 2017
 Lagunella guaycura Maya-Morales, Jiménez & Palacios-Cardiel, 2017 (type) — Mexico

Leptocoelotes
Leptocoelotes Wang, 2002
 Leptocoelotes edentulus (Wang & Ono, 1998) — Taiwan
 Leptocoelotes pseudoluniformis (Zhang, Peng & Kim, 1997) (type) — China

Lineacoelotes
Lineacoelotes Xu, Li & Wang, 2008
 Lineacoelotes bicultratus (Chen, Zhao & Wang, 1991) — China
 Lineacoelotes funiushanensis (Hu, Wang & Wang, 1991) — China
 Lineacoelotes longicephalus Xu, Li & Wang, 2008 (type) — China
 Lineacoelotes nitidus (Li & Zhang, 2002) — China
 Lineacoelotes strenuus Xu, Li & Wang, 2008 — China

Longicoelotes
Longicoelotes Wang, 2002
 Longicoelotes geei Zhang & Zhao, 2017 — China
 Longicoelotes karschi Wang, 2002 (type) — China
 Longicoelotes kulianganus (Chamberlin, 1924) — China
 Longicoelotes senkakuensis (Shimojana, 2000) — Japan (Ryukyu Is.)

Lycosoides
Lycosoides Lucas, 1846
 Lycosoides caparti (de Blauwe, 1980) — Morocco, Algeria
 Lycosoides coarctata (Dufour, 1831) — Mediterranean
 Lycosoides crassivulva (Denis, 1954) — Morocco
 Lycosoides flavomaculata Lucas, 1846 (type) — Mediterranean
 Lycosoides instabilis (Denis, 1954) — Morocco
 Lycosoides lehtineni Marusik & Guseinov, 2003 — Azerbaijan
 Lycosoides leprieuri (Simon, 1875) — Algeria, Tunisia
 Lycosoides parva (Denis, 1954) — Morocco
 Lycosoides subfasciata (Simon, 1870) — Morocco, Algeria
 Lycosoides variegata (Simon, 1870) — Spain, Morocco, Algeria

M

Mahura
Mahura Forster & Wilton, 1973
 Mahura accola Forster & Wilton, 1973 — New Zealand
 Mahura bainhamensis Forster & Wilton, 1973 — New Zealand
 Mahura boara Forster & Wilton, 1973 — New Zealand
 Mahura crypta Forster & Wilton, 1973 — New Zealand
 Mahura detrita Forster & Wilton, 1973 — New Zealand
 Mahura hinua Forster & Wilton, 1973 — New Zealand
 Mahura musca Forster & Wilton, 1973 — New Zealand
 Mahura rubella Forster & Wilton, 1973 — New Zealand
 Mahura rufula Forster & Wilton, 1973 — New Zealand
 Mahura scuta Forster & Wilton, 1973 — New Zealand
 Mahura sorenseni Forster & Wilton, 1973 — New Zealand
 Mahura southgatei Forster & Wilton, 1973 — New Zealand
 Mahura spinosa Forster & Wilton, 1973 — New Zealand
 Mahura spinosoides Forster & Wilton, 1973 — New Zealand
 Mahura takahea Forster & Wilton, 1973 — New Zealand
 Mahura tarsa Forster & Wilton, 1973 — New Zealand
 Mahura turris Forster & Wilton, 1973 (type) — New Zealand
 Mahura vella Forster & Wilton, 1973 — New Zealand

Maimuna
Maimuna Lehtinen, 1967
 Maimuna bovierlapierrei (Kulczyński, 1911) — Lebanon, Israel
 Maimuna cariae Brignoli, 1978 — Turkey
 Maimuna carmelica Levy, 1996 — Israel
 Maimuna cretica (Kulczyński, 1903) — Greece, Crete
 Maimuna inornata (O. Pickard-Cambridge, 1872) — Greece, Syria, Israel
 Maimuna meronis Levy, 1996 — Israel
 Maimuna vestita (C. L. Koch, 1841) (type) — Eastern Mediterranean

Malthonica
Malthonica Simon, 1898
 Malthonica africana Simon & Fage, 1922 — East Africa
 Malthonica daedali Brignoli, 1980 — Greece (Crete)
 Malthonica lusitanica Simon, 1898 (type) — Portugal to France
 Malthonica minoa (Brignoli, 1976) — Greece (Crete)
 Malthonica oceanica Barrientos & Cardoso, 2007 — Portugal
 Malthonica paraschiae Brignoli, 1984 — Greece
 Malthonica spinipalpis Deltshev, 1990 — Greece

Melpomene
Melpomene O. Pickard-Cambridge, 1898
 Melpomene bicavata (F. O. Pickard-Cambridge, 1902) — Mexico
 Melpomene chamela Maya-Morales & Jiménez, 2017 — Mexico
 Melpomene chiricana Chamberlin & Ivie, 1942 — Panama
 Melpomene coahuilana (Gertsch & Davis, 1940) — Mexico
 Melpomene elegans O. Pickard-Cambridge, 1898 (type) — Mexico
 Melpomene panamana (Petrunkevitch, 1925) — Panama
 Melpomene penetralis (F. O. Pickard-Cambridge, 1902) — Costa Rica
 Melpomene plesia Chamberlin & Ivie, 1942 — Panama
 Melpomene quadrata (Kraus, 1955) — El Salvador
 Melpomene rita (Chamberlin & Ivie, 1941) — USA
 Melpomene singula (Gertsch & Ivie, 1936) — Mexico
 Melpomene solisi Maya-Morales & Jiménez, 2017 — Mexico
 Melpomene transversa (F. O. Pickard-Cambridge, 1902) — Mexico

Mistaria
Mistaria Lehtinen, 1967
 Mistaria fagei (Caporiacco, 1949) — Kenya
 Mistaria leucopyga (Pavesi, 1883) (type) — Central, East Africa, Yemen
 Mistaria leucopyga niangarensis (Lessert, 1927) — East Africa
 Mistaria nairobii (Caporiacco, 1949) — Central, East Africa
 Mistaria nyeupenyeusi G. M. Kioko & S. Q. Li, 2018 — Kenya
 Mistaria zorica (Strand, 1913) — Central, East Africa

N

Neorepukia
Neorepukia Forster & Wilton, 1973
 Neorepukia hama Forster & Wilton, 1973 — New Zealand
 Neorepukia pilama Forster & Wilton, 1973 (type) — New Zealand

Neotegenaria
Neotegenaria Roth, 1967
 Neotegenaria agelenoides Roth, 1967 (type) — Guyana

Neowadotes
Neowadotes Alayón, 1995
 Neowadotes casabito Alayón, 1995 (type) — Hispaniola

Notiocoelotes
Notiocoelotes Wang, Xu & Li, 2008
 Notiocoelotes laosensis Wang, Xu & Li, 2008 — Laos
 Notiocoelotes lingulatus Wang, Xu & Li, 2008 — China
 Notiocoelotes maoganensis Zhao & Li, 2016 — China
 Notiocoelotes membranaceus Liu & Li, 2010 — China
 Notiocoelotes orbiculatus Liu & Li, 2010 — China
 Notiocoelotes palinitropus (Zhu & Wang, 1994) (type) — China
 Notiocoelotes parvitriangulus Liu, Li & Pham, 2010 — Vietnam
 Notiocoelotes pseudolingulatus Liu & Li, 2010 — China
 Notiocoelotes pseudovietnamensis Liu, Li & Pham, 2010 — Vietnam
 Notiocoelotes qiongzhongensis Zhao & Li, 2016 — China
 Notiocoelotes sparus (Dankittipakul, Chami-Kranon & Wang, 2005) — Thailand
 Notiocoelotes spirellus Liu & Li, 2010 — China
 Notiocoelotes vietnamensis Wang, Xu & Li, 2008 — Vietnam

Novalena
Novalena Chamberlin & Ivie, 1942
 Novalena ajusco Maya-Morales & Jiménez, 2017 — Mexico
 Novalena alamo Maya-Morales & Jiménez, 2017 — Mexico
 Novalena alvarezi Maya-Morales & Jiménez, 2017 — Mexico
 Novalena annamae (Gertsch & Davis, 1940) — Mexico
 Novalena approximata (Gertsch & Ivie, 1936) — Mexico, Costa Rica
 Novalena attenuata (F. O. Pickard-Cambridge, 1902) — Mexico, Guatemala
 Novalena atzimbo Maya-Morales & Jiménez, 2017 — Mexico
 Novalena bipartita (Kraus, 1955) — El Salvador
 Novalena bipunctata Roth, 1967 — Mexico, Trinidad
 Novalena bosencheve Maya-Morales & Jiménez, 2017 — Mexico
 Novalena calavera Chamberlin & Ivie, 1942 — USA
 Novalena chamberlini Maya-Morales & Jiménez, 2017 — Mexico
 Novalena cieneguilla Maya-Morales & Jiménez, 2017 — Mexico
 Novalena cintalapa Maya-Morales & Jiménez, 2017 — Mexico
 Novalena clara Maya-Morales & Jiménez, 2017 — Mexico
 Novalena comaltepec Maya-Morales & Jiménez, 2017 — Mexico
 Novalena costata (F. O. Pickard-Cambridge, 1902) — Costa Rica
 Novalena creel Maya-Morales & Jiménez, 2017 — Mexico
 Novalena dentata Maya-Morales & Jiménez, 2017 — Mexico
 Novalena divisadero Maya-Morales & Jiménez, 2017 — Mexico
 Novalena durango Maya-Morales & Jiménez, 2017 — Mexico
 Novalena franckei Maya-Morales & Jiménez, 2017 — Mexico
 Novalena garnica Maya-Morales & Jiménez, 2017 — Mexico
 Novalena gibarrai Maya-Morales & Jiménez, 2017 — Mexico
 Novalena intermedia (Chamberlin & Gertsch, 1930) (type) — Canada, USA
 Novalena irazu Maya-Morales & Jiménez, 2017 — Costa Rica
 Novalena iviei Maya-Morales & Jiménez, 2017 — Mexico
 Novalena ixtlan Maya-Morales & Jiménez, 2017 — Mexico
 Novalena jiquilpan Maya-Morales & Jiménez, 2017 — Mexico
 Novalena laticava (Kraus, 1955) — El Salvador
 Novalena leonensis Maya-Morales & Jiménez, 2017 — Mexico
 Novalena lutzi (Gertsch, 1933) — USA
 Novalena mexiquensis Maya-Morales & Jiménez, 2017 — Mexico
 Novalena oaxaca Maya-Morales & Jiménez, 2017 — Mexico
 Novalena orizaba (Banks, 1898) — Mexico
 Novalena paricutin Maya-Morales & Jiménez, 2017 — Mexico
 Novalena perote Maya-Morales & Jiménez, 2017 — Mexico
 Novalena plata Maya-Morales & Jiménez, 2017 — USA
 Novalena poncei Maya-Morales & Jiménez, 2017 — Mexico
 Novalena popoca Maya-Morales & Jiménez, 2017 — Mexico
 Novalena prieta Maya-Morales & Jiménez, 2017 — Mexico
 Novalena puebla Maya-Morales & Jiménez, 2017 — Mexico
 Novalena punta Maya-Morales & Jiménez, 2017 — Mexico
 Novalena rothi Maya-Morales & Jiménez, 2017 — USA
 Novalena saltoensis Maya-Morales & Jiménez, 2017 — Mexico
 Novalena shlomitae (García-Villafuerte, 2009) — Mexico
 Novalena simplex (F. O. Pickard-Cambridge, 1902) — Mexico, Guatemala
 Novalena sinaloa Maya-Morales & Jiménez, 2017 — Mexico
 Novalena tacana Maya-Morales & Jiménez, 2017 — Mexico, Guatemala
 Novalena triunfo Maya-Morales & Jiménez, 2017 — Mexico
 Novalena valdezi Maya-Morales & Jiménez, 2017 — Mexico
 Novalena victoria Maya-Morales & Jiménez, 2017 — Mexico
 Novalena volcanes Maya-Morales & Jiménez, 2017 — Mexico

Nuconarius
Nuconarius Zhao & S. Q. Li, 2018
 Nuconarius brevipatellatus Zhao & S. Q. Li, 2018 (type) — China
 Nuconarius capitulatus (Wang, 2003) — China
 Nuconarius pseudocapitulatus (Wang, 2003) — China

O

Olorunia
Olorunia Lehtinen, 1967
 Olorunia punctata Lehtinen, 1967 (type) — Congo

Oramia
Oramia Forster, 1964
 Oramia chathamensis (Simon, 1899) — New Zealand (Chatham Is.)
 Oramia frequens (Rainbow, 1920) — Australia (Lord Howe Is.)
 Oramia littoralis Forster & Wilton, 1973 — New Zealand
 Oramia mackerrowi (Marples, 1959) — New Zealand
 Oramia marplesi Forster, 1964 — New Zealand (Auckland Is.)
 Oramia occidentalis (Marples, 1959) — New Zealand
 Oramia rubrioides (Hogg, 1909) (type) — New Zealand
 Oramia solanderensis Forster & Wilton, 1973 — New Zealand

Oramiella
[[File:Oramiella wisei AMNZ5063 Dorsal view.jpg|thumb|right|Oramiella wisei]]Oramiella Forster & Wilton, 1973
 Oramiella wisei Forster & Wilton, 1973 (type) — New Zealand

OrumcekiaOrumcekia Koçak & Kemal, 2008
 Orumcekia gemata (Wang, 1994) (type) — China, Vietnam
 Orumcekia jianhuii (Tang & Yin, 2002) — China
 Orumcekia lanna (Dankittipakul, Sonthichai & Wang, 2006) — Thailand
 Orumcekia libo (Wang, 2003) — China, Vietnam
 Orumcekia mangshan (Zhang & Yin, 2001) — China
 Orumcekia pseudogemata (Xu & Li, 2007) — China
 Orumcekia sigillata (Wang, 1994) — China
 Orumcekia subsigillata (Wang, 2003) — China

P
PapiliocoelotesPapiliocoelotes Zhao & Li, 2016
 Papiliocoelotes guanyinensis Zhao & Li, 2016 — China
 Papiliocoelotes guitangensis Zhao & Li, 2016 — China
 Papiliocoelotes jiepingensis Zhao & Li, 2016 — China
 Papiliocoelotes meiyuensis Zhao & Li, 2016 — China
 Papiliocoelotes yezhouensis Zhao & Li, 2016 (type) — China

ParamyroParamyro Forster & Wilton, 1973
 Paramyro apicus Forster & Wilton, 1973 (type) — New Zealand
 Paramyro parapicus Forster & Wilton, 1973 — New Zealand

PireneitegaPireneitega Kishida, 1955
 Pireneitega armeniaca (Brignoli, 1978) — Turkey
 Pireneitega bidens (Caporiacco, 1935) — Karakorum
 Pireneitega burqinensis Zhao & Li, 2016 — China
 Pireneitega cottarellii (Brignoli, 1978) — Turkey
 Pireneitega fedotovi (Charitonov, 1946) — Uzbekistan
 Pireneitega fuyunensis Zhao & Li, 2016 — China
 Pireneitega garibaldii (Kritscher, 1969) — Italy
 Pireneitega gongliuensis Zhao & Li, 2016 — China
 Pireneitega huashanensis Zhao & Li, 2017 — China
 Pireneitega huochengensis Zhao & Li, 2016 — China
 Pireneitega involuta (Wang, Yin, Peng & Xie, 1990) — China
 Pireneitega kovblyuki Zhang & Marusik, 2016 — Tajikistan
 Pireneitega lini Zhao & Li, 2016 — China
 Pireneitega liui Zhao & Li, 2016 — China
 Pireneitega luctuosa (L. Koch, 1878) — Central Asia, China, Russia (Far East), Korea, Japan
 Pireneitega luniformis (Zhu & Wang, 1994) — China
 Pireneitega lushuiensis Zhao & Li, 2017 — China
 Pireneitega major (Kroneberg, 1875) — Uzbekistan, Tajikistan, China
 Pireneitega muratovi Zhang & Marusik, 2016 — Tajikistan
 Pireneitega ovtchinnikovi Kovblyuk, Kastrygina, Marusik & Ponomarev, 2013 — Caucasus (Russia, Georgia)
 Pireneitega pyrenaea (Simon, 1870) — Spain, France
 Pireneitega ramitensis Zhang & Marusik, 2016 — Tajikistan
 Pireneitega segestriformis (Dufour, 1820) (type) — Spain, Andorra, France
 Pireneitega spasskyi (Charitonov, 1946) — Caucasus (Russia, Georgia, Azerbaijan)
 Pireneitega spinivulva (Simon, 1880) — Russia (Far East), China, Korea
 Pireneitega taishanensis (Wang, Yin, Peng & Xie, 1990) — China
 Pireneitega taiwanensis Wang & Ono, 1998 — Taiwan
 Pireneitega tianchiensis (Wang, Yin, Peng & Xie, 1990) — China
 Pireneitega tyurai Zhang & Marusik, 2016 — Tajikistan
 Pireneitega wensuensis Zhao & Li, 2016 — China
 Pireneitega wui Zhao & Li, 2016 — China
 Pireneitega xinping Zhang, Zhu & Song, 2002 — China
 Pireneitega xiyankouensis Zhao & Li, 2017 — China
 Pireneitega yaoi Zhao & Li, 2016 — China
 Pireneitega zonsteini Zhang & Marusik, 2016 — Tajikistan

PlatocoelotesPlatocoelotes Wang, 2002
 Platocoelotes ampulliformis Liu & Li, 2008 — China
 Platocoelotes bifidus Yin, Xu & Yan, 2010 — China
 Platocoelotes brevis Liu & Li, 2008 — China
 Platocoelotes daweishanensis Xu & Li, 2008 — China
 Platocoelotes fanjingshan Jiang, Chen & Zhang, 2018 — China
 Platocoelotes furcatus Liu & Li, 2008 — China
 Platocoelotes globosus Xu & Li, 2008 — China
 Platocoelotes icohamatoides (Peng & Wang, 1997) — China
 Platocoelotes imperfectus Wang & Jäger, 2007 — China
 Platocoelotes impletus (Peng & Wang, 1997) (type) — China
 Platocoelotes kailiensis Wang, 2003 — China
 Platocoelotes latus Xu & Li, 2008 — China
 Platocoelotes lichuanensis (Chen & Zhao, 1998) — China
 Platocoelotes luoi Chen & Li, 2015 — China
 Platocoelotes paralatus Xu & Li, 2008 — China
 Platocoelotes polyptychus Xu & Li, 2007 — China
 Platocoelotes qinglinensis Chen & Li, 2015 — China
 Platocoelotes shuiensis Chen & Li, 2015 — China
 Platocoelotes strombuliformis Liu & Li, 2008 — China
 Platocoelotes tianyangensis Chen & Li, 2015 — China
 Platocoelotes uenoi (Yamaguchi & Yaginuma, 1971) — Japan
 Platocoelotes xianwuensis Chen & Li, 2015 — China
 Platocoelotes zhuchuandiani Liu & Li, 2012 — China

PorotakaPorotaka Forster & Wilton, 1973
 Porotaka detrita Forster & Wilton, 1973 (type) — New Zealand
 Porotaka florae Forster & Wilton, 1973 — New Zealand

PseudotegenariaPseudotegenaria Caporiacco, 1934
 Pseudotegenaria parva Caporiacco, 1934 (type) — Libya

R
RobusticoelotesRobusticoelotes Wang, 2002
 Robusticoelotes pichoni (Schenkel, 1963) (type) — China
 Robusticoelotes sanmenensis (Tang, Yin & Zhang, 2002) — China
 Robusticoelotes subpichoni Zhang, Zhu & Wang, 2017 — China

RothilenaRothilena Maya-Morales & Jiménez, 2013
 Rothilena cochimi Maya-Morales & Jiménez, 2013 — Mexico
 Rothilena golondrina Maya-Morales & Jiménez, 2013 — Mexico
 Rothilena griswoldi Maya-Morales & Jiménez, 2013 (type) — Mexico
 Rothilena naranjensis Maya-Morales & Jiménez, 2013 — Mexico
 Rothilena pilar Maya-Morales & Jiménez, 2013 — Mexico
 Rothilena sudcaliforniensis Maya-Morales & Jiménez, 2013 — Mexico

RualenaRualena Chamberlin & Ivie, 1942
 Rualena alleni Chamberlin & Ivie, 1942 — USA
 Rualena avila Chamberlin & Ivie, 1942 — USA
 Rualena balboae (Schenkel, 1950) — USA
 Rualena cavata (F. O. Pickard-Cambridge, 1902) — Mexico
 Rualena cedros Maya-Morales & Jiménez, 2016 — Mexico
 Rualena cockerelli Chamberlin & Ivie, 1942 — USA
 Rualena cruzana Chamberlin & Ivie, 1942 — USA
 Rualena magnacava Chamberlin & Ivie, 1942 — USA, Mexico
 Rualena parritas Maya-Morales & Jiménez, 2016 — Mexico
 Rualena pasquinii Brignoli, 1974 — Mexico
 Rualena rua (Chamberlin, 1919) — USA
 Rualena surana Chamberlin & Ivie, 1942 (type) — USA
 Rualena thomas Maya-Morales & Jiménez, 2016 — USA
 Rualena ubicki Maya-Morales & Jiménez, 2016 — Mexico

S
SinocoelotesSinocoelotes Zhao & Li, 2016
 Sinocoelotes acicularis (Wang, Griswold & Ubick, 2009) — China
 Sinocoelotes arcuatus Zhang & Chen, 2018 — China
 Sinocoelotes cangshanensis Zhao & Li, 2016 — China
 Sinocoelotes forficatus (Liu & Li, 2010) — China
 Sinocoelotes guangxian (Zhang, Yang, Zhu & Song, 2003) — China
 Sinocoelotes hehuaensis Zhao & Li, 2016 (type) — China
 Sinocoelotes kangdingensis Zhao & Li, 2016 — China
 Sinocoelotes ludingensis Zhao & Li, 2016 — China
 Sinocoelotes luoshuiensis Zhao & Li, 2016 — China
 Sinocoelotes mahuanggouensis Zhao & Li, 2016 — China
 Sinocoelotes mangbangensis Zhao & Li, 2016 — China
 Sinocoelotes muliensis Zhao & Li, 2016 — China
 Sinocoelotes porus (Zhang, Zhu & Wang, 2017) — China
 Sinocoelotes pseudoguangxian (Wang, Griswold & Ubick, 2009) — China
 Sinocoelotes pseudoterrestris (Schenkel, 1963) — China
 Sinocoelotes pseudoyunnanensis (Wang, Griswold & Ubick, 2009) — China
 Sinocoelotes songi (Zhang, Zhu & Wang, 2017) — China
 Sinocoelotes subguangxian Wang & Zhang, 2018 — China
 Sinocoelotes thailandensis (Dankittipakul & Wang, 2003) — Thailand
 Sinocoelotes yanhengmei (Wang, Griswold & Ubick, 2009) — China
 Sinocoelotes yanyuanensis Zhao & Li, 2016 — China
 Sinocoelotes yunnanensis (Schenkel, 1963) — China

SinodraconariusSinodraconarius Zhao & S. Q. Li, 2018
 Sinodraconarius cawarongensis Zhao & S. Q. Li, 2018 — China
 Sinodraconarius muruoensis Zhao & S. Q. Li, 2018 — China
 Sinodraconarius patellabifidus (Wang, 2003) — China
 Sinodraconarius sangjiuensis Zhao & S. Q. Li, 2018 (type) — China
 Sinodraconarius yui Zhao & S. Q. Li, 2018 — China

SpiricoelotesSpiricoelotes Wang, 2002
 Spiricoelotes anshiensis Chen & Li, 2016 — China
 Spiricoelotes chufengensis Chen & Li, 2016 — China
 Spiricoelotes nansheensis Chen & Li, 2016 — China
 Spiricoelotes pseudozonatus Wang, 2003 — China
 Spiricoelotes taipingensis Chen & Li, 2016 — China
 Spiricoelotes urumensis (Shimojana, 1989) — Japan (Ryukyu Is.)
 Spiricoelotes xianheensis Chen & Li, 2016 — China
 Spiricoelotes xiongxinensis Chen & Li, 2016 — China
 Spiricoelotes zonatus (Peng & Wang, 1997) — China, Japan

T
TamgriniaTamgrinia Lehtinen, 1967
 Tamgrinia alveolifera (Schenkel, 1936) (type) — India, China
 Tamgrinia coelotiformis (Schenkel, 1963) — China
 Tamgrinia laticeps (Schenkel, 1936) — China
 Tamgrinia palpator (Hu & Li, 1987) — China
 Tamgrinia rectangularis Xu & Li, 2006 — China
 Tamgrinia semiserrata Xu & Li, 2006 — China
 Tamgrinia tibetana (Hu & Li, 1987) — China
 Tamgrinia tulugouensis Wang, 2000 — China

TararuaTararua Forster & Wilton, 1973
 Tararua celeripes (Urquhart, 1891) (type) — New Zealand
 Tararua clara Forster & Wilton, 1973 — New Zealand
 Tararua diversa Forster & Wilton, 1973 — New Zealand
 Tararua foordi Forster & Wilton, 1973 — New Zealand
 Tararua puna Forster & Wilton, 1973 — New Zealand
 Tararua ratuma Forster & Wilton, 1973 — New Zealand
 Tararua versuta Forster & Wilton, 1973 — New Zealand

TegecoelotesTegecoelotes Ovtchinnikov, 1999
 Tegecoelotes chikunii Okumura, Ono & Nishikawa, 2011 — Japan
 Tegecoelotes corasides (Bösenberg & Strand, 1906) — Japan
 Tegecoelotes dorsatus (Uyemura, 1936) — Japan
 Tegecoelotes dysodentatus Zhang & Zhu, 2005 — China
 Tegecoelotes echigonis Nishikawa, 2009 — Japan
 Tegecoelotes eurydentatus Zhang, Zhu & Wang, 2017 — China
 Tegecoelotes hibaensis Okumura, Ono & Nishikawa, 2011 — Japan
 Tegecoelotes ignotus (Bösenberg & Strand, 1906) — Japan
 Tegecoelotes michikoae (Nishikawa, 1977) — Japan
 Tegecoelotes mizuyamae Ono, 2008 — Japan
 Tegecoelotes otomo Nishikawa, 2009 — Japan
 Tegecoelotes religiosus Nishikawa, 2009 — Japan
 Tegecoelotes secundus (Paik, 1971) (type) — Russia (Far East), China, Korea, Japan
 Tegecoelotes tateyamaensis Nishikawa, 2009 — Japan
 Tegecoelotes yogoensis Nishikawa, 2009 — Japan

TegenariaTegenaria Latreille, 1804
 Tegenaria abchasica Charitonov, 1941 — Caucasus (Russia, Georgia)
 Tegenaria achaea Brignoli, 1977 — Greece, Turkey
 Tegenaria adomestica Guseinov, Marusik & Koponen, 2005 — Azerbaijan
 Tegenaria africana Lucas, 1846 — Algeria
 Tegenaria agnolettii Brignoli, 1978 — Turkey
 Tegenaria alamto Zamani, Marusik & Malek-Hosseini, 2018 — Iran
 Tegenaria angustipalpis Levy, 1996 — Greece, Israel
 Tegenaria anhela Brignoli, 1972 — Turkey
 Tegenaria animata Kratochvíl & Miller, 1940 — Serbia, Montenegro, Macedonia
 Tegenaria annae Bolzern, Burckhardt & Hänggi, 2013 — Greece
 Tegenaria annulata Kulczyński, 1913 — Bosnia-Hercegovina, Croatia, Serbia, Montenegro
 Tegenaria argaeica Nosek, 1905 — Bulgaria, Turkey
 Tegenaria ariadnae Brignoli, 1984 — Greece (Crete)
 Tegenaria armigera Simon, 1873 — France (Corsica), Italy (Sardinia)
 Tegenaria averni Brignoli, 1978 — Turkey
 Tegenaria bayeri Kratochvíl, 1934 — Bosnia-Hercegovina, Serbia, Montenegro
 Tegenaria bayrami Kaya, Kunt, Marusik & Uğurtaş, 2010 — Turkey
 Tegenaria bosnica Kratochvíl & Miller, 1940 — Croatia, Bosnia-Hercegovina, Serbia, Montenegro
 Tegenaria bozhkovi (Deltshev, 2008) — Bulgaria, Greece
 Tegenaria campestris (C. L. Koch, 1834) — Europe to Azerbaijan
 Tegenaria capolongoi Brignoli, 1977 — Italy
 Tegenaria carensis Barrientos, 1981 — Spain
 Tegenaria chebana Thorell, 1897 — Myanmar
 Tegenaria chiricahuae Roth, 1968 — USA
 Tegenaria chumachenkoi Kovblyuk & Ponomarev, 2008 — Russia (Europe, Caucasus), Georgia
 Tegenaria circeoensis Bolzern, Burckhardt & Hänggi, 2013 — Italy
 Tegenaria comnena Brignoli, 1978 — Turkey
 Tegenaria comstocki Gajbe, 2004 — India
 Tegenaria concolor Simon, 1873 — Syria
 Tegenaria cottarellii Brignoli, 1978 — Turkey
 Tegenaria croatica Bolzern, Burckhardt & Hänggi, 2013 — Croatia
 Tegenaria daiamsanesis Kim, 1998 — Korea
 Tegenaria dalmatica Kulczyński, 1906 — Mediterranean to Ukraine
 Tegenaria decolorata Kratochvíl & Miller, 1940 — Croatia
 Tegenaria dentifera Kulczyński, 1908 — Cyprus
 Tegenaria domestica (Clerck, 1757) (type) — Europe to China, Japan. Introduced to Australia, New Zealand, the Americas
 Tegenaria eleonorae Brignoli, 1974 — Italy
 Tegenaria elysii Brignoli, 1978 — Turkey
 Tegenaria epacris Levy, 1996 — Israel
 Tegenaria faniapollinis Brignoli, 1978 — Greece, Turkey
 Tegenaria femoralis Simon, 1873 — France, Italy
 Tegenaria ferruginea (Panzer, 1804) — Europe, Azores. Introduced to Venezuela
 Tegenaria forestieroi Brignoli, 1978 — Turkey
 †Tegenaria fragmentum Wunderlich, 2004w — Palaeogene Baltic amber
 Tegenaria halidi Guseinov, Marusik & Koponen, 2005 — Azerbaijan
 Tegenaria hamid Brignoli, 1978 — Turkey
 Tegenaria hasperi Chyzer, 1897 — France to Turkey, Russia (Europe)
 Tegenaria hauseri Brignoli, 1979 — Greece
 Tegenaria hemanginiae Reddy & Patel, 1992 — India
 Tegenaria henroti Dresco, 1956 — Sardinia
 Tegenaria ismaillensis Guseinov, Marusik & Koponen, 2005 — Azerbaijan
 Tegenaria karaman Brignoli, 1978 — Turkey
 †Tegenaria lacazei Gourret, 1887 — Palaeogene Aix-en-Provence Chattian lacustrine Limestone
 Tegenaria lapicidinarum Spassky, 1934 — Ukraine, Russia (Europe)
 Tegenaria lehtineni (Guseinov, Marusik & Koponen, 2005) — Azerbaijan
 Tegenaria lenkoranica (Guseinov, Marusik & Koponen, 2005) — Azerbaijan, Iran
 Tegenaria levantina Barrientos, 1981 — Spain
 Tegenaria longimana Simon, 1898 — Turkey, Caucasus (Russia, Georgia)
 Tegenaria lunakensis Tikader, 1964 — Nepal
 Tegenaria lyncea Brignoli, 1978 — Turkey, Azerbaijan
 Tegenaria maelfaiti Bosmans, 2011 — Greece
 Tegenaria mamikonian Brignoli, 1978 — Turkey
 Tegenaria maroccana Denis, 1956 — Morocco
 Tegenaria maronita Simon, 1873 — Syria, Lebanon, Israel
 Tegenaria mediterranea Levy, 1996 — Israel
 Tegenaria melbae Brignoli, 1972 — Turkey
 Tegenaria mercanturensis Bolzern & Hervé, 2010 — France
 Tegenaria michae Brignoli, 1978 — Lebanon
 Tegenaria mirifica Thaler, 1987 — Switzerland, Austria. Italy
 Tegenaria montana Deltshev, 1993 — Bulgaria
 Tegenaria montiszasensis Bolzern, Burckhardt & Hänggi, 2013 — Greece
 Tegenaria nakhchivanica (Guseinov, Marusik & Koponen, 2005) — Azerbaijan
 †Tegenaria obtusa Wunderlich, 2004w — Palaeogene Baltic amber
 Tegenaria oribata Simon, 1916 — France
 Tegenaria pagana C. L. Koch, 1840 — Europe to Central Asia. Introduced to USA, Mexico, Brazil, Chile
 Tegenaria parietina (Fourcroy, 1785) — Europe, North Africa to Israel and Central Asia. Introduced to Jamaica, Paraguay, South Africa, Sri Lanka
 Tegenaria parmenidis Brignoli, 1971 — Italy
 Tegenaria parvula Thorell, 1875 — Italy, Romania
 Tegenaria pasquinii Brignoli, 1978 — Turkey
 Tegenaria percuriosa Brignoli, 1972 — Bulgaria, Turkey
 Tegenaria pieperi Brignoli, 1979 — Greece (Crete)
 Tegenaria pindosiensis Bolzern, Burckhardt & Hänggi, 2013 — Greece
 Tegenaria podoprygorai (Kovblyuk, 2006) — Ukraine
 Tegenaria pontica Charitonov, 1947 — Georgia
 Tegenaria pseudolyncea (Guseinov, Marusik & Koponen, 2005) — Azerbaijan
 Tegenaria racovitzai Simon, 1907 — Spain, France
 Tegenaria ramblae Barrientos, 1978 — Portugal, Spain
 Tegenaria regispyrrhi Brignoli, 1976 — Bulgaria, Greece, Balkans
 Tegenaria rhodiensis Caporiacco, 1948 — Greece (Rhodes), Turkey
 Tegenaria rilaensis Deltshev, 1993 — Macedonia, Bulgaria
 Tegenaria sbordonii Brignoli, 1971 — Italy
 Tegenaria schmalfussi Brignoli, 1976 — Greece (Crete)
 Tegenaria schoenhoferi Bolzern, Burckhardt & Hänggi, 2013 — Greece
 Tegenaria scopifera Barrientos, Ribera & Pons, 2002 — Spain (Balearic Is.)
 Tegenaria serrana Barrientos & Sánchez-Corral, 2013 — Spain
 Tegenaria shillongensis Barman, 1979 — India
 Tegenaria silvestris L. Koch, 1872 — Europe
 Tegenaria talyshica Guseinov, Marusik & Koponen, 2005 — Azerbaijan
 Tegenaria taurica Charitonov, 1947 — Ukraine, Georgia
 Tegenaria tekke Brignoli, 1978 — Turkey
 Tegenaria tridentina L. Koch, 1872 — Europe
 Tegenaria tyrrhenica Dalmas, 1922 — France, Italy
 Tegenaria vallei Brignoli, 1972 — Libya
 Tegenaria vanensis Danişman & Karanfil, 2015 — Turkey
 Tegenaria vankeerorum Bolzern, Burckhardt & Hänggi, 2013 — Greece (Rhodes), Turkey
 Tegenaria vignai Brignoli, 1978 — Turkey
 †Tegenaria virilis  Menge in C. L. Koch & Berendt, 18546 — Palaeogene Baltic amber
 Tegenaria wittmeri Brignoli, 1978 — Bhutan
 Tegenaria zagatalensis Guseinov, Marusik & Koponen, 2005 — Azerbaijan
 Tegenaria zamanii Marusik & Omelko, 2014 — Iran

TextrixTextrix Sundevall, 1833
 Textrix caudata L. Koch, 1872 — Macaronesia, Northern Africa, Southern Europe, Syria
 Textrix chyzeri de Blauwe, 1980 — Hungary, Bosnia and Herzegovina, Bulgaria
 Textrix denticulata (Olivier, 1789) (type) — Europe, Turkey
 Textrix intermedia Wunderlich, 2008 — France
 Textrix nigromarginata Strand, 1906 — Ethiopia
 Textrix pinicola Simon, 1875 — Portugal to Italy
 Textrix rubrofoliata Pesarini, 1990 — Italy (Sicily)

TikaderiaTikaderia Lehtinen, 1967
 Tikaderia psechrina (Simon, 1906) (type) — Himalayas

TonsillaTonsilla Wang & Yin, 1992
 Tonsilla defossa Xu & Li, 2006 — China
 Tonsilla distalis Zhang, Zhu & Wang, 2017 — China
 Tonsilla eburniformis Wang & Yin, 1992 — China
 Tonsilla lyrata (Wang, Yin, Peng & Xie, 1990) — China
 Tonsilla makros Wang, 2003 — China
 Tonsilla mopanensis Zhang, Zhu & Wang, 2017 — China
 Tonsilla rostrum Jiang, Chen & Zhang, 2018 — China
 Tonsilla tautispina (Wang, Yin, Peng & Xie, 1990) — China
 Tonsilla truculenta Wang & Yin, 1992 (type) — China
 Tonsilla variegata (Wang, Yin, Peng & Xie, 1990) — China
 Tonsilla yanlingensis (Zhang, Yin & Kim, 2000) — China

TortolenaTortolena Chamberlin & Ivie, 1941
 Tortolena dela Chamberlin & Ivie, 1941 — USA
 Tortolena glaucopis (F. O. Pickard-Cambridge, 1902) (type) — Mexico, Costa Rica

TroglocoelotesTroglocoelotes Zhao & S. Q. Li, 2019
 Troglocoelotes bailongensis Zhao & S. Q. Li, 2019 — China
 Troglocoelotes banmenensis Zhao & S. Q. Li, 2019 — China
 Troglocoelotes liangensis Zhao & S. Q. Li, 2019 — China
 Troglocoelotes nongchiensis Zhao & S. Q. Li, 2019 — China
 Troglocoelotes proximus (Chen, Zhu & Kim, 2008) — China
 Troglocoelotes qixianensis Zhao & S. Q. Li, 2019 — China
 Troglocoelotes tortus (Chen, Zhu & Kim, 2008) — China
 Troglocoelotes yosiianus (Nishikawa, 1999) — China
 Troglocoelotes yumiganensis Zhao & S. Q. Li, 2019 (type) — China

TuapokaTuapoka Forster & Wilton, 1973
 Tuapoka cavata Forster & Wilton, 1973 — New Zealand
 Tuapoka ovalis Forster & Wilton, 1973 (type) — New Zealand

U-Z
UrocorasUrocoras Ovtchinnikov, 1999
 Urocoras longispina (Kulczyński, 1897) (type) — Central, Eastern Europe
 Urocoras matesianus (de Blauwe, 1973) — Italy
 Urocoras munieri (Simon, 1880) — Italy, Slovenia, Croatia
 Urocoras nicomedis (Brignoli, 1978) — Turkey

WadotesWadotes Chamberlin, 1925
 Wadotes bimucronatus (Simon, 1898) — USA
 Wadotes calcaratus (Keyserling, 1887) — USA, Canada
 Wadotes carinidactylus Bennett, 1987 — USA
 Wadotes deceptis Bennett, 1987 — USA
 Wadotes dixiensis Chamberlin, 1925 (type) — USA
 Wadotes georgiensis Howell, 1974 — USA
 Wadotes hybridus (Emerton, 1890) — USA, Canada
 Wadotes mumai Bennett, 1987 — USA
 Wadotes saturnus Bennett, 1987 — USA
 Wadotes tennesseensis Gertsch, 1936 — USA
 Wadotes willsi'' Bennett, 1987 — USA

References

Agelenidae
Agelenidae